= Woolwich Garrison =

Garrison in the Royal Borough of Greenwich in London, England

- Woolwich Station
- Woolwich
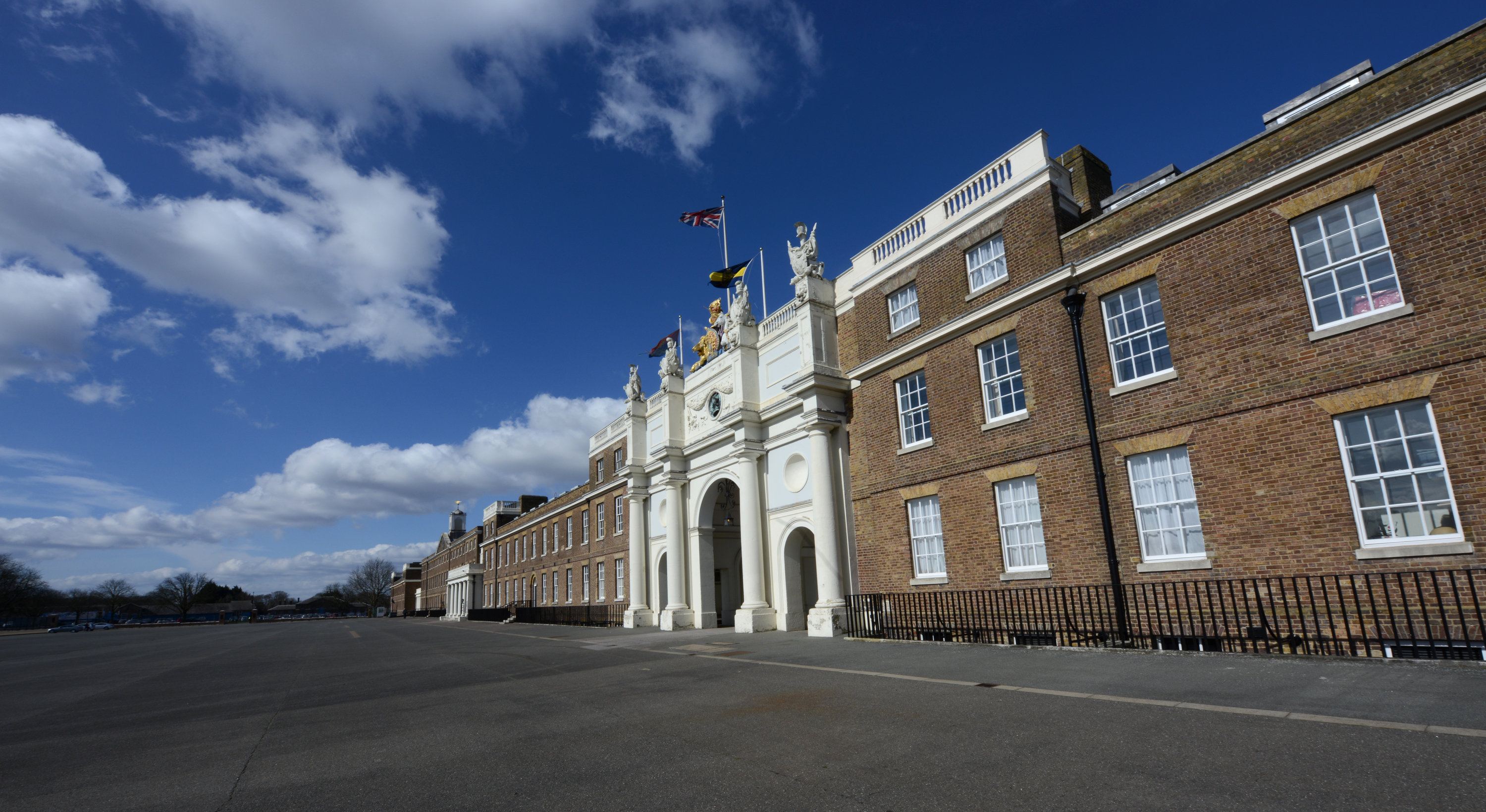
- Headquarters Woolwich Station is co-located with National Reserve Headquarters, Royal Artillery, in Royal Artillery Barracks, Woolwich.

Site information
- Type: Garrison
- Owner: Ministry of Defence
- Operator: British Army

Location
- Location within London
- Coordinates: 51°29′14″N 0°3′31″E

Site history
- Built for: Board of Ordnance
- In use: 1776-present

Woolwich Garrison (now referred to as Woolwich Station) is a garrison or station of the British Army. Geographically it is in Woolwich, in the Royal Borough of Greenwich. In terms of command, it is within the Army's London District.

At its largest, the garrison oversaw two division headquarters plus supporting units and around 7 battalions. Over the course of the 20th century the garrison began to diminish in size and importance, and much of its land and buildings were sold. In April 2001, the garrison reduced to a station, and Central Volunteer Headquarters, Royal Artillery, took over the role of HQ. Nevertheless, Royal Artillery Barracks continued to serve as the headquarters of the Royal Artillery until 2007, when it moved to Larkhill Garrison, since when other units have been based within the barracks and at nearby Napier Lines. The army is scheduled to leave Woolwich in 2028 (though in 2020 it was announced that, contrary to earlier indications, the King's Troop, Royal Horse Artillery, will remain).

== Historical overview ==
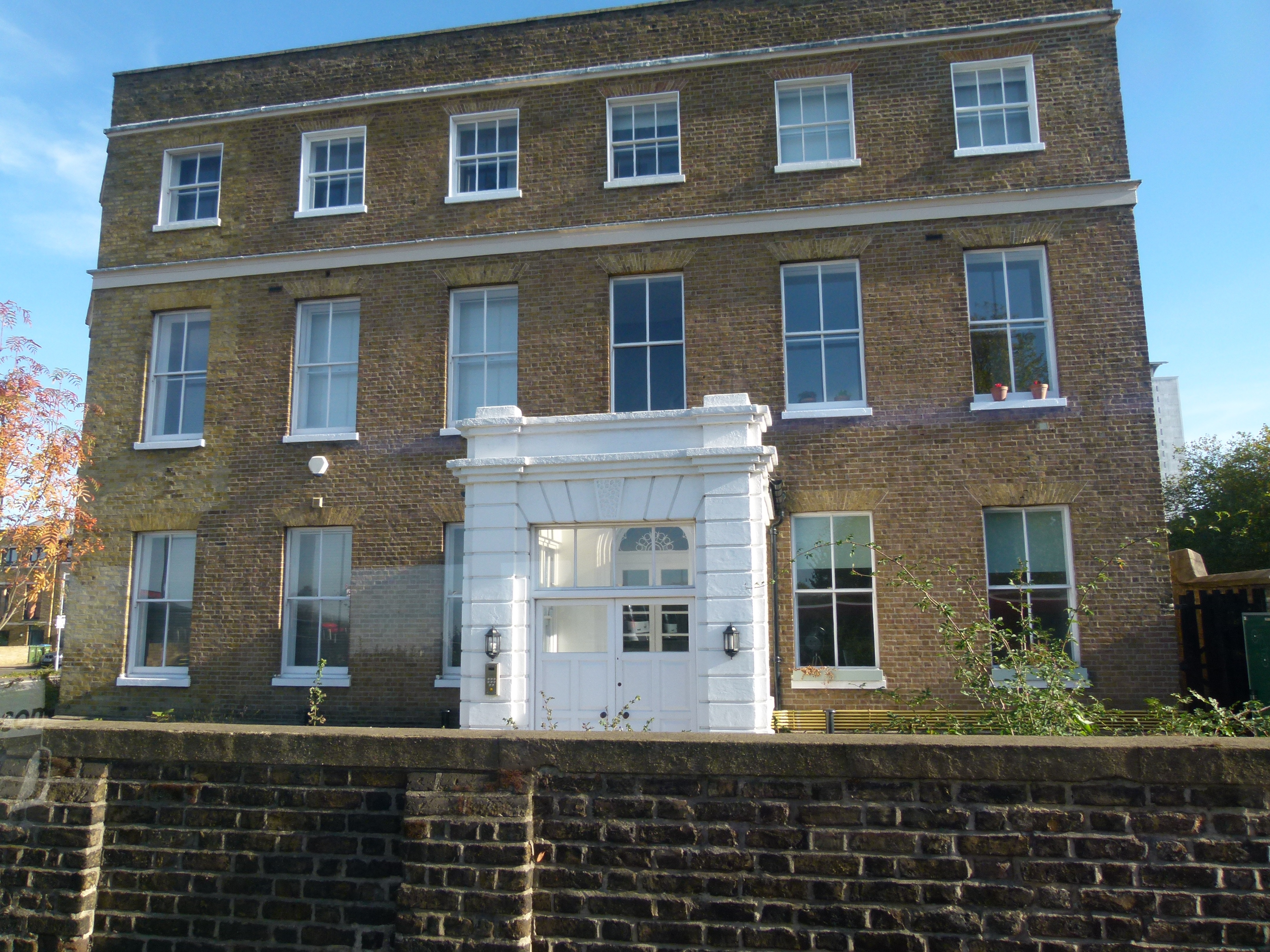
Government House, dating from the 1780s, formerly housed the Garrison Commandant and served as the Garrison Headquarters for most of the 20th century.

There has been a military presence in Woolwich since at least the 16th century, when troops would have been engaged in defending Woolwich Dockyard (also known as The King's Yard). What gave the town its distinctive military character, however, was the arrival of the Board of Ordnance. The Board first acquired land here (known as the Warren) in the 1670s; this evolved to become the Royal Arsenal, which was (among other things) the British Government's principal armaments manufacturing facility for over 200 years. The Board was a military as well as a civil office of state: the Royal Regiment of Artillery and the Corps Of Royal Engineers were both military formations of the Board, raised in the early 18th century and only becoming part of the British Army in the 1850s. In 1776 the Royal Artillery moved out of its initial headquarters in the Warren into a new, purpose-built Royal Artillery Barracks just north of Woolwich Common. Subsequently, as a variety of military quarters, institutions and amenities sprang up the surrounding area, and a new garrison town began to emerge.

Over time Woolwich Garrison has been composed of some or all of the following elements:

=== Royal Artillery Barracks ===
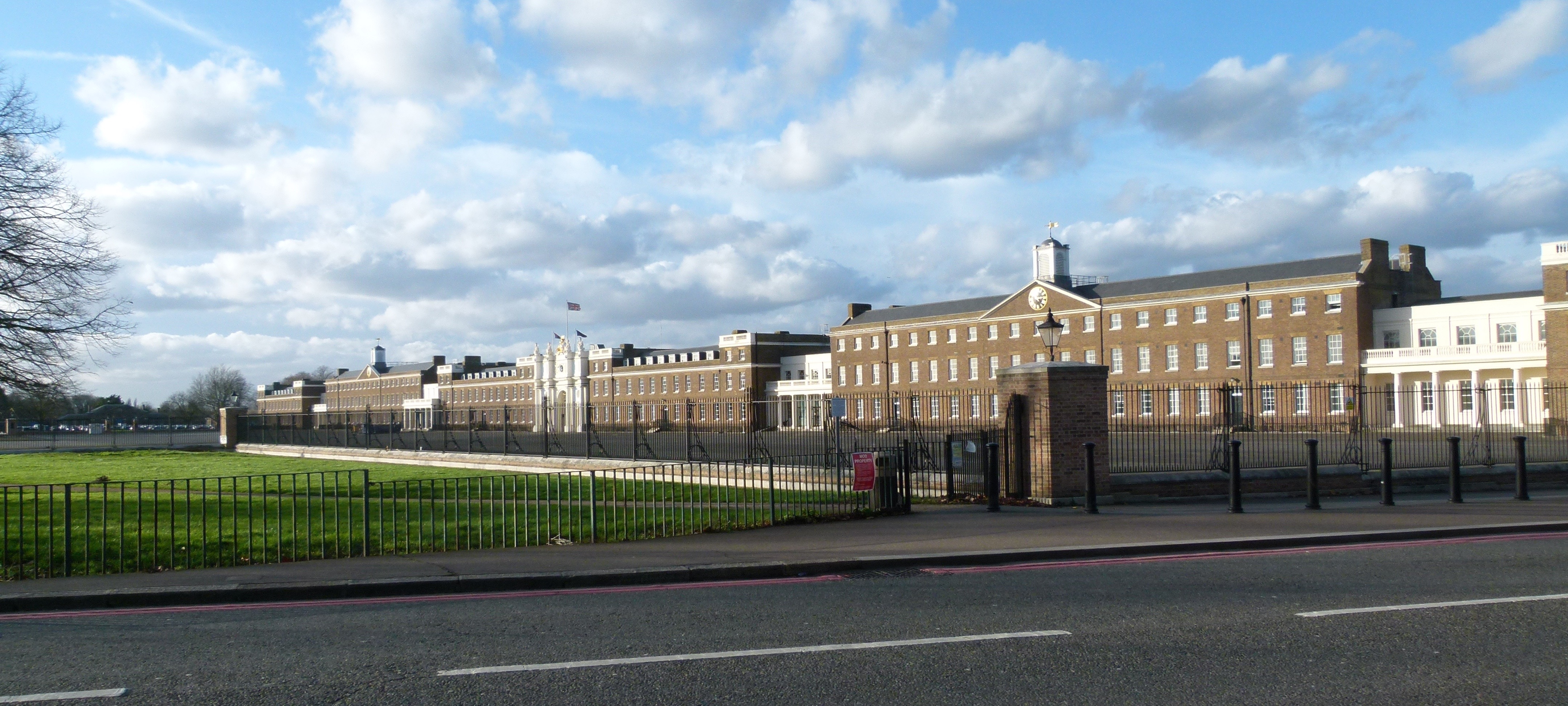
Royal Artillery Barracks, viewed from the south-east.

The barracks was built in 1774-76 and more than doubled in size after being extended in 1802–05. The blocks facing the parade ground housed artillery officers and troops; behind were a pair of quadrangles which provided accommodation for the Royal Horse Artillery, and beyond these another long block (built for the Corps of Royal Artillery Drivers). In the 1950s and 60s most of the surviving original buildings were demolished and replaced with modern blocks, though the main south façade was retained. The area of land known as the Barrack Field, adjoining the common, was purchased together with the site for the barracks and used for various military purposes (recreational as well as operational). Alongside the parade ground a Gun Park was laid out for field gun drill exercises.

=== West of the Barracks ===
==== Royal Military Repository ====
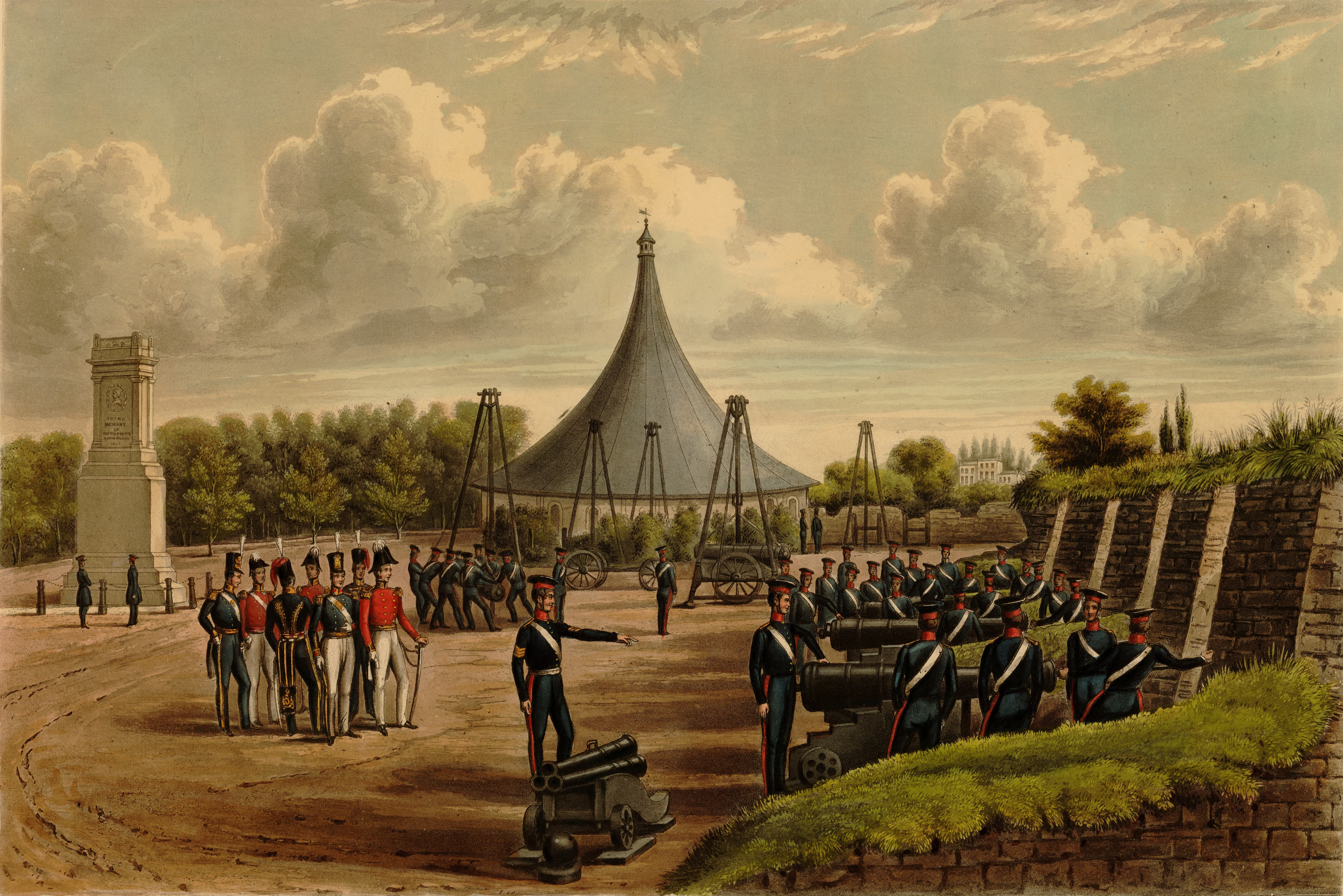
Royal Artillery Repository Exercises, 1844

In the 1770s, Captain (later Sir) William Congreve created a 'Repository of Military Machines' in the Warren: a collection of guns, mortars, models and other items used to teach gunners and engineers the history and practice of their craft. At the same time, he devised a set of practical training exercises, which were carried out under his supervision on open ground nearby; known as 'Repository Exercises', these involved manhandling heavy guns and equipment over 'Ditches, Ravines, Inclosures or Lines' designed to simulate challenges likely to be encountered in the field. In 1778 the Royal Military Repository was given formal recognition, and Repository Exercises became compulsory.

In 1802 the building in the Warren burned down; but shortly afterwards Congreve re-established the Repository on recently acquired land just to the west of the Barrack Field. There, what became known as the 'Repository Grounds' (today Repository Woods) were laid out with trees, ditches, ravines, earthworks, and other structures in order to train troops in the movement of guns, ammunition and heavy equipment across difficult terrain. There were two large ponds, on which men were taught 'to lay pontoons, to transport artillery upon rafts, and all the different methods that can be adopted for the passage of troops across rivers, &c.'. In the 1820s an earthwork training fortification was added along the length of the eastern boundary, on which were mounted 'all the different sorts of cannon used in the defence of fortified towns'.

On the southern part of the site, four long gun-carriage sheds were built in 1802-5 (the northernmost, with offices at either end, designed to accommodate items from the Repository's historic collection). To the north of the sheds, the Rotunda (previously erected at Carlton House to celebrate the peace of 1814) was rebuilt in 1820; it served to house the surviving model collection of the Royal Military Repository (which in the meantime had been on display in the old Academy in the Warren).

In the 1880s it was still the case that all officers of the Artillery (including those of the Militia and Volunteers) had to pass a term of instruction at the Repository. The Rotunda by this time had been opened to the public as the Royal Artillery Museum. In 1890, the Royal Military Repository closed (much of its work having transferred to Shoeburyness). The Repository Woods remained in used for military training, however, through the 20th and into the 21st century.

==== Napier Lines ====
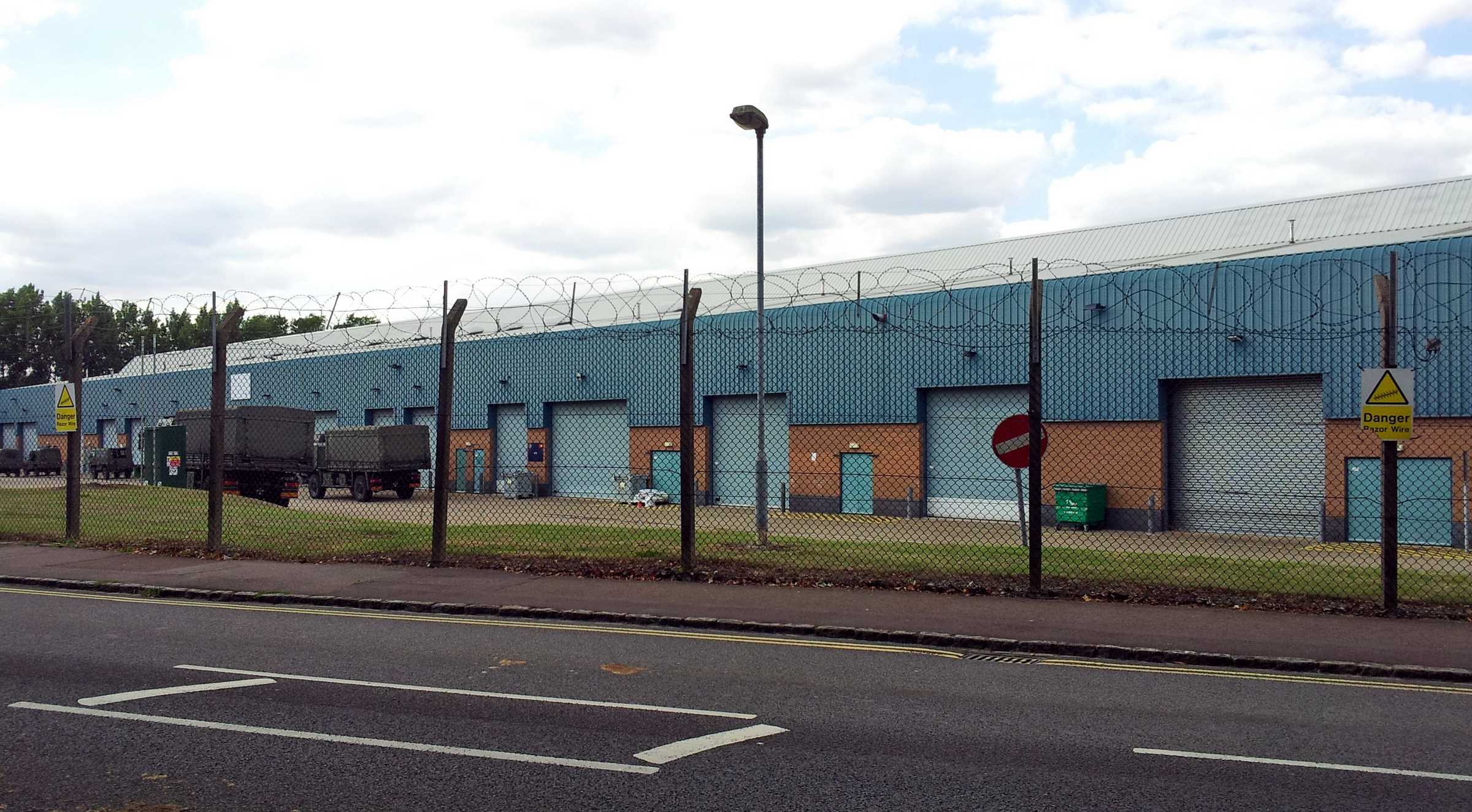
Napier Lines, 2015.

In the early 20th century the Ordnance College converted some of the old Repository Sheds into training workshops, accommodating 520 'wheelers, fitters, smiths, painters and others'. By the time of the Second World War it had evolved into a vehicle maintenance base, and after the war it was taken over by the Royal Electrical and Mechanical Engineers (REME), whose senior officer on site was accommodated in 'Repository House' (the former Gatehouse on Repository Road). In 1995 (REME having moved to new facilities in the main barracks) the workshops were replaced with large new sheds to store the vehicles and matériel of the 16th Air Defence Regiment; they were named Napier Lines (the regiment having just relocated from Napier Barracks, Dortmund, in Germany). 16th Regiment, the last Regiment of Royal Artillery to be stationed in Woolwich, departed in 2007. In 2011 part of the area was converted, with new stable blocks added, to form a base for the King's Troop Royal Horse Artillery named King George VI Lines.

==== The Observatory (Magnetic Office) ====
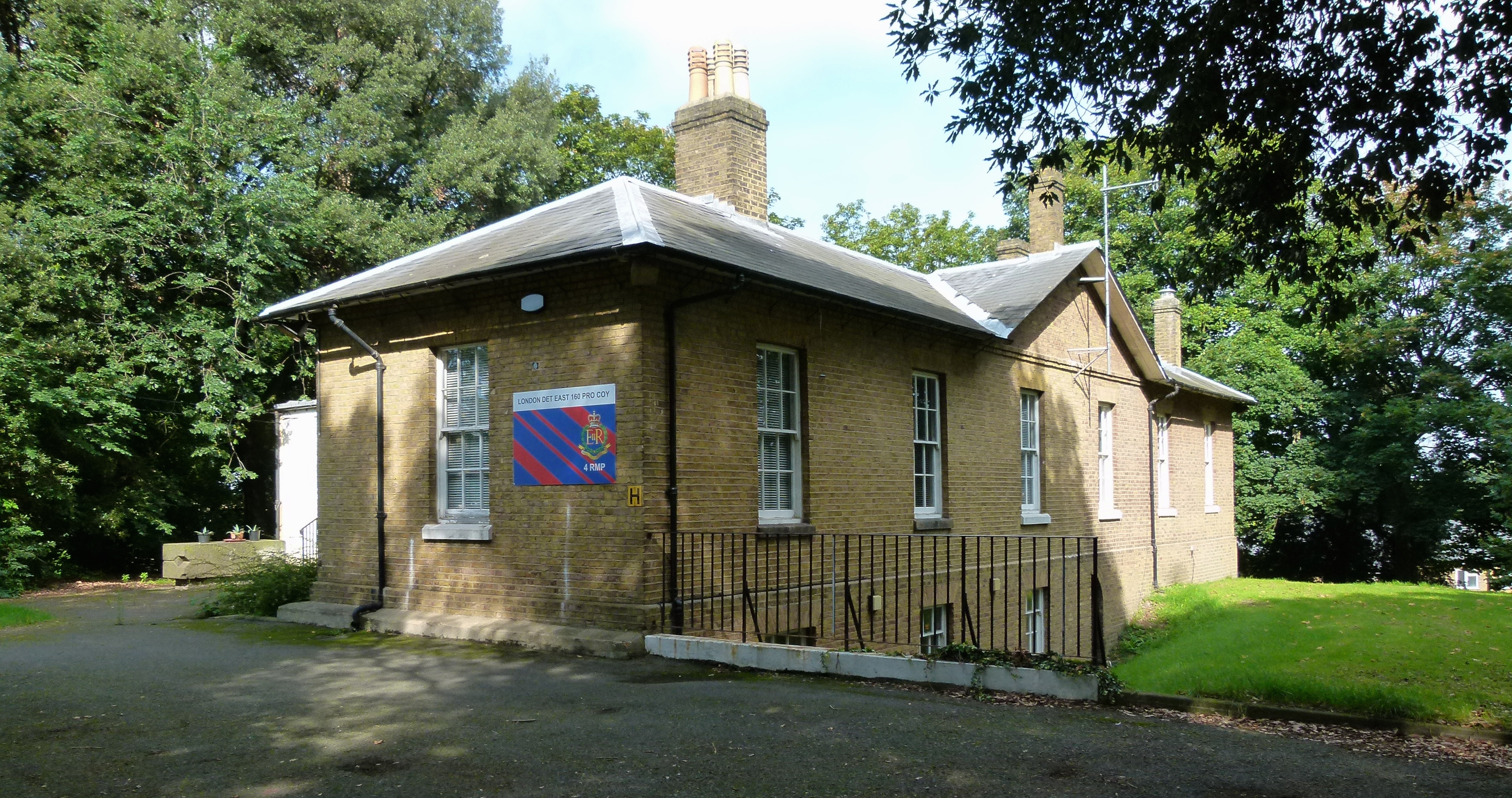
Royal Artillery Institution Observatory: the surviving former annexe (also called Magnetic Office).

On Green Hill, east of the Repository, an observatory was built in 1838. This was the first headquarters of the Royal Artillery Institution (a scientific educational club for officers), which had been founded that year by Lieutenants John Lefroy and Frederick Eardley-Wilmot. From 1839 it also served as the home base for Edward Sabine's global survey of terrestrial magnetism (with which Lefroy and Eardley-Wilmot were closely involved); it was known for a time as the Magnetic Office, until the Magnetic Survey moved to Kew Observatory in 1871. The observatory was extended in 1853, with the addition of a domed equatorial room. The following year, the RA Institution moved into new larger premises within the main Barracks complex; but it continued to use the observatory for astronomy until 1926. While the equatorial room was demolished soon afterwards, the original small transit room survives, alongside the pedimented annexe which originally housed the Institution's library and reading room. In the 21st century it accommodated the Royal Military Police.

==== Housing and other amenities ====
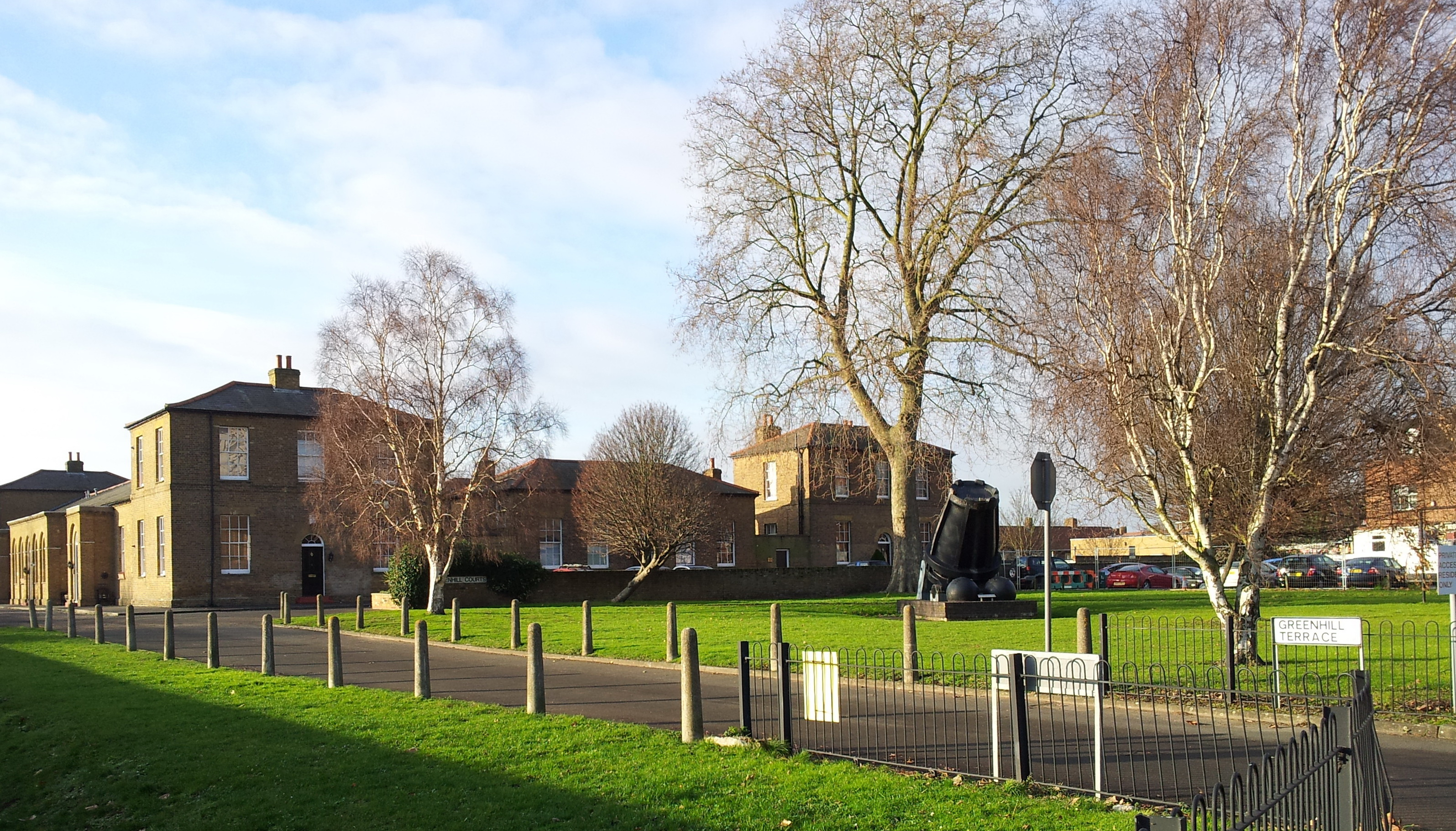
Former Regimental School on Greenhill Terrace, with Mallet's Mortar alongside.

In the area between the Gun Park and the Rotunda, terraced housing was built in the 1920s to serve as married quarters for soldiers. More terraces were added in the 1930s and 1950s; as Green Hill Barracks they continued to house soldiers into the 21st century. North of the Gun Park, rows of gun carriage sheds were built in the 19th century; known as Congreve Lines, the area now contains the Army Medical Centre and welfare services.

Further to the north, a Regimental School had been established in 1808, in timber sheds by the barracks. In the 1850s the school was rebuilt on what is now Green Hill Terrace. By the 1860s, Green Hill Schools had a daily attendance of over a thousand children, with teaching also provided on site for non-commissioned officers as a way of combatting illiteracy. In the evening the building was put to social and other uses; it remained in military use until the 1960s.

=== South of the Barracks ===
==== Woolwich Common ====
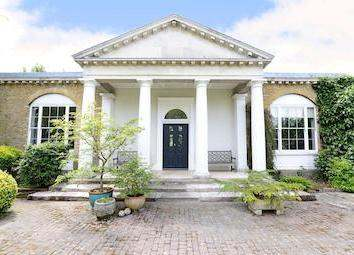
1 Repository Road: Royal Artillery South West Gatehouse (1806) - now a private residence

Use of Woolwich Common by the military predated the opening of the barracks: guns had been tested there since the 1720s, and in 1770 an artillery range was set up for target practice. In 1802-4 four Acts of Parliament transferred leasehold ownership of the common (which until then had also been used as public grazing land) to the Board of Ordnance; the 'Gatehouse' on Repository Road (which originally housed soldiers guarding the garrison) dates from around this time. The Board acquired freehold ownership in 1812.

The common has long been used for sport: on the west side of the common a stadium was built by the Army in 1920; it was used for football, rugby, show jumping, athletics, and also military tattoos. The shooting events at the 2012 Summer Olympics and Paralympics were held at a temporary venue on the northern edge of the common; (the original plan to conduct the shooting at the National Shooting Centre at Bisley, Surrey, was changed after the International Olympic Committee expressed reservations about the number of sports proposed to be staged outside London).

==== Royal Horse Infirmary ====
The common was regularly used for the training and exercise of horses (activities which have resumed since the return to Woolwich of the King's Troop RHA). The Royal Artillery and the Royal Horse Artillery both made extensive use of horses, as did the Royal Army Service Corps (based in Connaught Barracks). In 1805, at the far south-western corner of the common, a Veterinary Establishment was built by the Ordnance Veterinary Service. Later named the Royal Horse Infirmary, it became the headquarters of the Army Veterinary Department (predecessor of the RAVC, whose Corps Depot remained in Woolwich until 1939). Adjoining it was a Remount Establishment, to procure and train new horses for the Artillery and Royal Engineers, which was later expanded to form the main English depot of the Army Remount Service.

==== Shrapnel Barracks ====
Alongside the Royal Horse Infirmary, a hutted camp was built at the time of the Crimean War to serve as a cavalry barracks; the 'Hut Barracks' later housed Artillery units. In 1896 Shrapnel Barracks opened on the site, to provide accommodation for the men and horses of a field brigade of Artillery.

==== Royal Military Academy ====
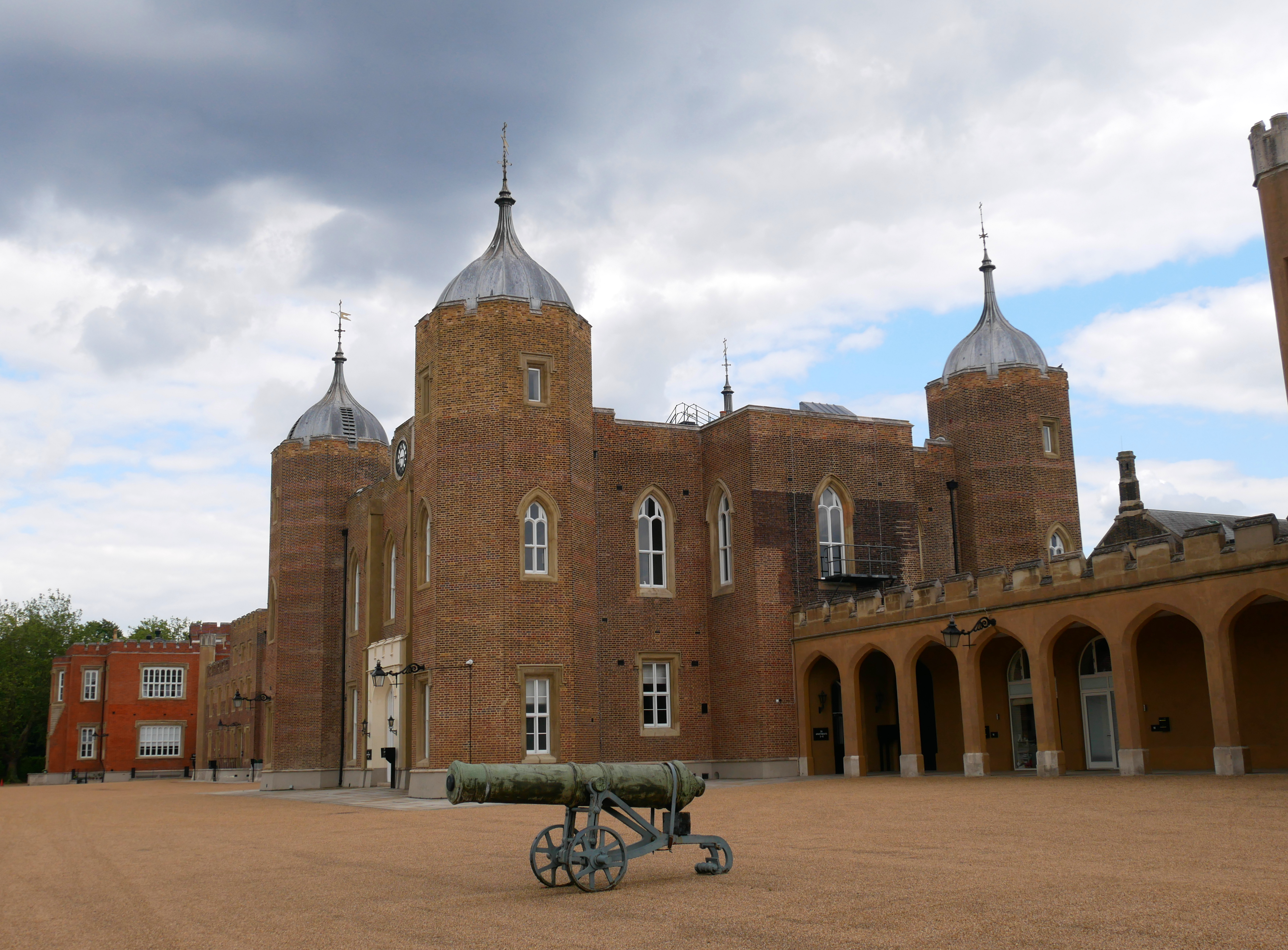
Central block of the old Royal Military Academy.

The Royal Military Academy, which trained officer cadets of the Royal Artillery and Royal Engineers from 1741 to 1939, was initially founded in the Warren before moving into new premises built at the southern end of Woolwich Common in 1806. Expanded at various points, the institution remained here until being amalgamated into the Royal Military College, Sandhurst, in 1947.

==== Military Hospitals ====
In the aftermath of the Crimean War, Woolwich gained a new military hospital named the Herbert Hospital. Opened in 1865, it was (like the nearby Royal Marine Infirmary, but on a larger scale) a 'pavilion plan' hospital: built in accordance with the latest design principles for disease prevention, as advocated by Florence Nightingale, John Roberton and Douglas Galton (who was the hospital's architect). In 1972 work began on building a new hospital nearby (on the site of Shrapnel Barracks and the Veterinary Hospital) to be named the Queen Elizabeth Military Hospital; when it was opened in 1977, the Royal Herbert Hospital closed.

=== East of the Barracks ===
==== St George's Garrison Church ====
St George's Garrison Church was built to the east of the parade ground in 1863 (replacing the chapel within the barracks). Romanesque in style with Byzantine detailing, it was largely destroyed by a V1 flying bomb on 14 July 1944, but the ruins have been preserved as a memorial.

==== Royal Artillery Hospital (Connaught Barracks) ====
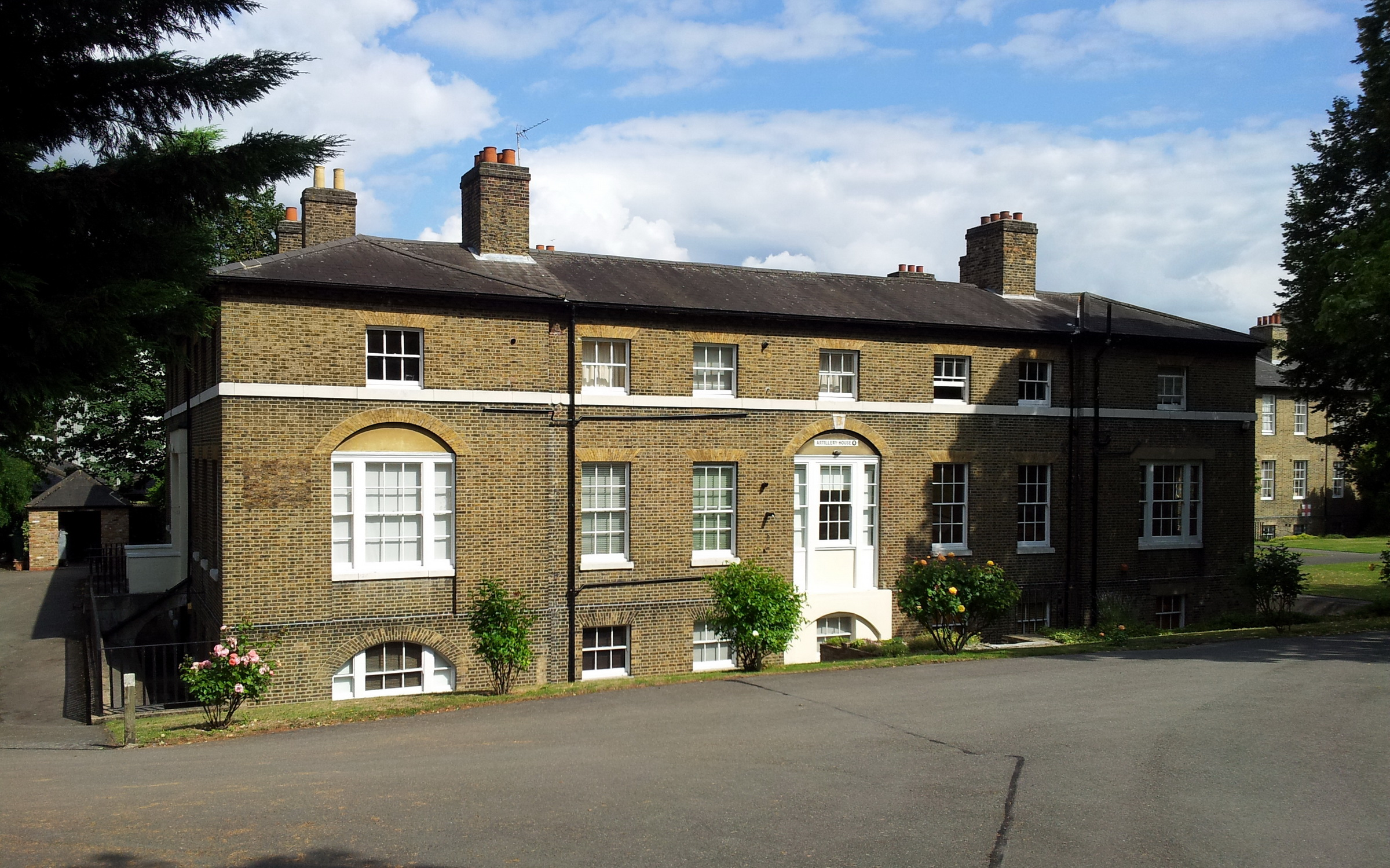
Part of Connaught Mews, built as the Royal Artillery Hospital (central block 1780, wings 1796)

In 1780, shortly after the opening of the artillery barracks, the Royal Artillery Hospital was opened close by, just to the east of the barracks. Later known as the Royal Ordnance Hospital, it was one of the first purpose-built military hospitals in England. Over time the building was expanded: first in 1794-6 (when two new wings were added, one for a convalescent barracks, the other for surgeons' quarters) and then in 1804–6, when a new hospital complex was added to the north (linked by a long covered gallery to the old buildings, which continued to provide convalescent space and staff accommodation).

Another ward block was added to the east in 1854; but after the establishment of the new Herbert Hospital in 1865, the Artillery Hospital buildings were converted into barracks and went on to serve as headquarters of the Military Train (who were the main providers of land-transport capability for the Army). The officers were accommodated in the 18th-century buildings, and the men in the 19th-century ward blocks. Stables for 240 horses were built in the former hospital grounds to the east (previously left undeveloped to prevent spread of diseases). Under the name Connaught Barracks, the complex went on to be the base of the Military Train's successor, the Horse Transport Branch of the Army Service Corps. Following mechanisation, the stables were renamed 'Motor Transport Lines', reflecting the Corps' new mode of conveyance. The Royal Army Service Corps remained here until 1962, when the Corps was amalgamated and the site redeveloped (the eighteenth-century hospital buildings survive as Connaught Mews, an apartment complex off Grand Depot Road).

==== The Grand Depot ====
In 1781 a garden was laid out to the north of the RA Hospital, initially to serve as a kitchen garden for the adjacent Royal Artillery Barracks. In 1804 the Grand Depôt of Field Artillery was established here: four long low sheds were built on the site, flanking a central range of workshops and offices, with a pair of magazines alongside to the west (all to designs by Lewis Wyatt). Here were maintained at all times 'thirty Brigades of Field Artillery, with Ammunition and Stores complete, and in a perfect state of readiness for any service' (a 'Brigade' in this context being defined as 'five Guns and one Howitzer'). The Grand Depôt served as headquarters for the Ordnance Field Train, a forerunner of the Royal Army Ordnance Corps, which was responsible for the custody, conveyance and distribution of guns, ammunition and stores to Artillery units on active service (and of ammunition to the Army as a whole). In 1859 the Field Train was amalgamated into the Military Store Department of the War Office.

In 1856, a Royal Army Clothing Department factory was built on the site of the two magazines (it also covered over most of what remained of the garden). Twelve years later, the factory moved to Pimlico.

On 1 October 1871, the entire area (then known as the Grand Depot Stores) was handed over to the Commandant of Woolwich Garrison and converted into additional barracks for the Artillery: Grand Depot Barracks. The former clothing factory became the main block of the barracks, and the old Grand Depôt sheds were converted into stables (with one of them being demolished to make space for a sizeable drill yard). By the 1880s Grand Depot Barracks accommodated a full field-brigade of artillery; and in the 20th century it continued to function as an extension of the adjacent Royal Artillery Barracks. The surviving Grand Depot buildings (including the listed central block of 1805) were demolished in 1970.

==== Artificers Barracks ====
In 1803 a barracks was built further to the east (south of Love Lane, west of Thomas Street), to designs by James Wyatt, to serve as headquarters for the Corps of Royal Military Artificers (later renamed the Royal Sappers and Miners) who, like the Royal Artillery, were under the Board of Ordnance rather than the War Office. By the 1840s it had been expanded to house three Companies (273 men in total). In 1856, however, the Sappers and Miners were amalgamated into the Royal Engineers, for whom a new Corps headquarters was established in Chatham. Nevertheless, a small detachment of Engineers remained to see to the needs of the garrison, and through the 20th century the barracks were referred to as the Engineer Barracks.

After 1856 the barracks accommodated the cadets of the Practical Class of the Royal Military Academy, until 1863 when they moved back to the (newly extended) main RMA buildings. Afterwards, spare capacity in the Engineer Barracks was used by the Royal Artillery as overflow accommodation for the Grand Depot Barracks next door. Again, despite being listed the Engineer Barracks were demolished, in 1970.

==== Housing and other amenities ====
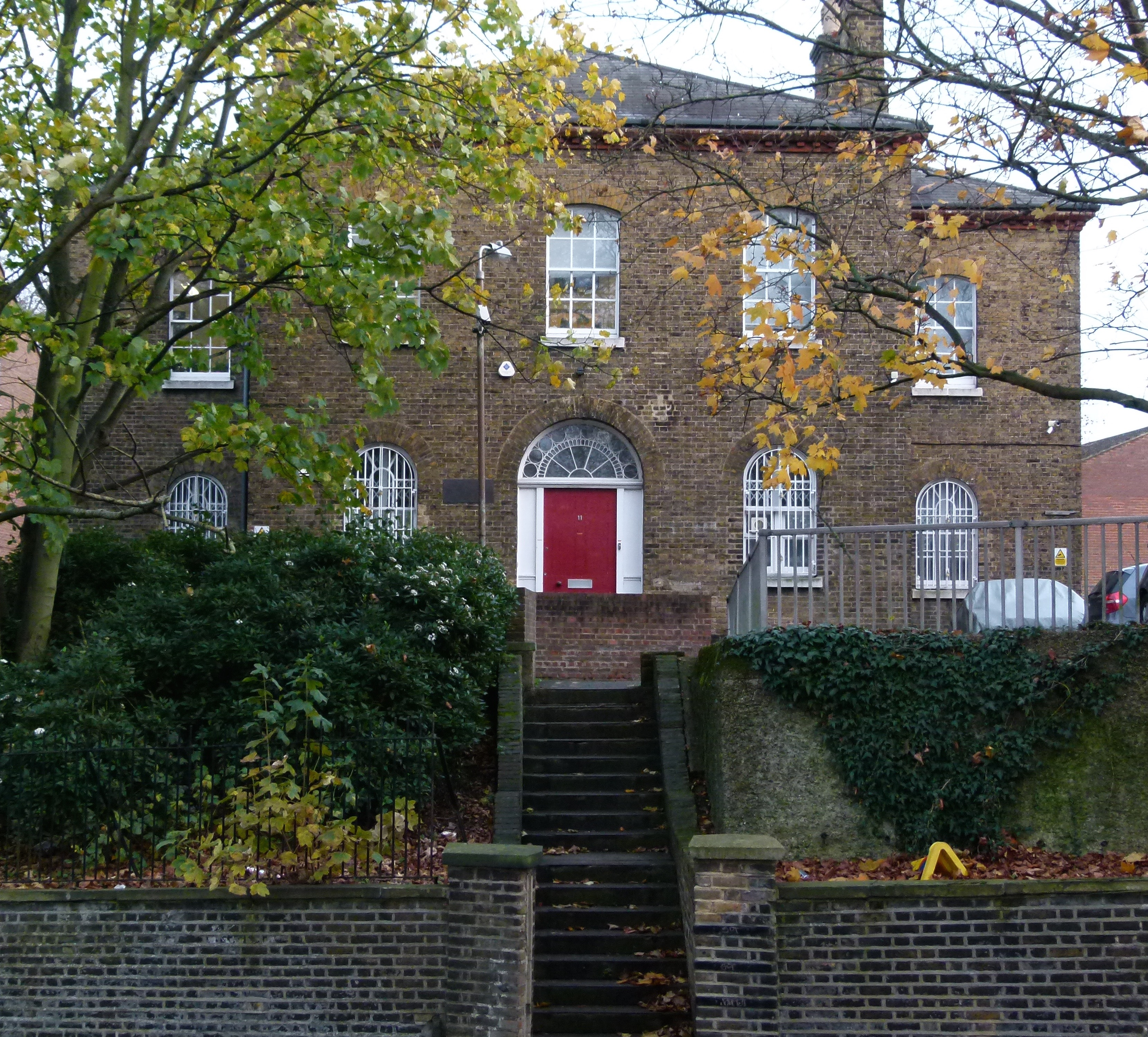
Engineer House, Woolwich.

From 1824, the Commander Royal Engineer (CRE) Woolwich lived in Mill Lane House (having moved there from premises in the Arsenal). When the Corps headquarters moved to Chatham, an office building (Engineer House) was built nearby as a base for the Engineer detachment remaining in Woolwich. It contained a drawing office and a darkroom, and a range of workshops was built alongside.

South of Engineer House, facing the Barrack Field, was the Garrison Dispensary: a single-storey range of buildings which later functioned as an Auxiliary Hospital; in the later 20th century it was known as the Garrison Medical Centre. Behind it stood the Garrison Female Hospital (later renamed the Military Maternity Hospital), which had been built at the same time as the Herbert Hospital to designs by the same architect (Douglas Galton). It remained operational until the mid-1970s.

South of the Dispensary stood St George's House (the Royal Artillery chaplain's quarters), and Government House (until 1936 the residence of the Garrison Commandant, which continued to serve as the Garrison Headquarters into the 1980s before being sold off in 1995).

=== North of the Barracks ===
==== The former Naval Dockyard ====
Woolwich Dockyard had been one of England's principal Royal Dockyards during the Tudor and Stuart periods, but it closed in 1869 as the Thames was by then too difficult to navigate for the naval vessels of the time. Subsequently, most of the site served as a subsidiary Ordnance Depot for the Military Store Department based in the Arsenal. Later an Army Pay Office was established here, responsible for the accounts not only of the Royal Field Artillery and Royal Horse Artillery, but also those of all soldiers serving with the Army Service Corps, the Army Ordnance Corps, the Army Veterinary Corps, and the Army Pay Corps itself. By 1914 it had grown to be the largest Army Pay Office in the country, with a military staff of 90 responsible for the administration of 60,000 personal accounts. The Records Offices of the Army Service Corps and Army Ordnance Corps were also based at the Clock House in the former Dockyard.

==== The former Marine Barracks ====
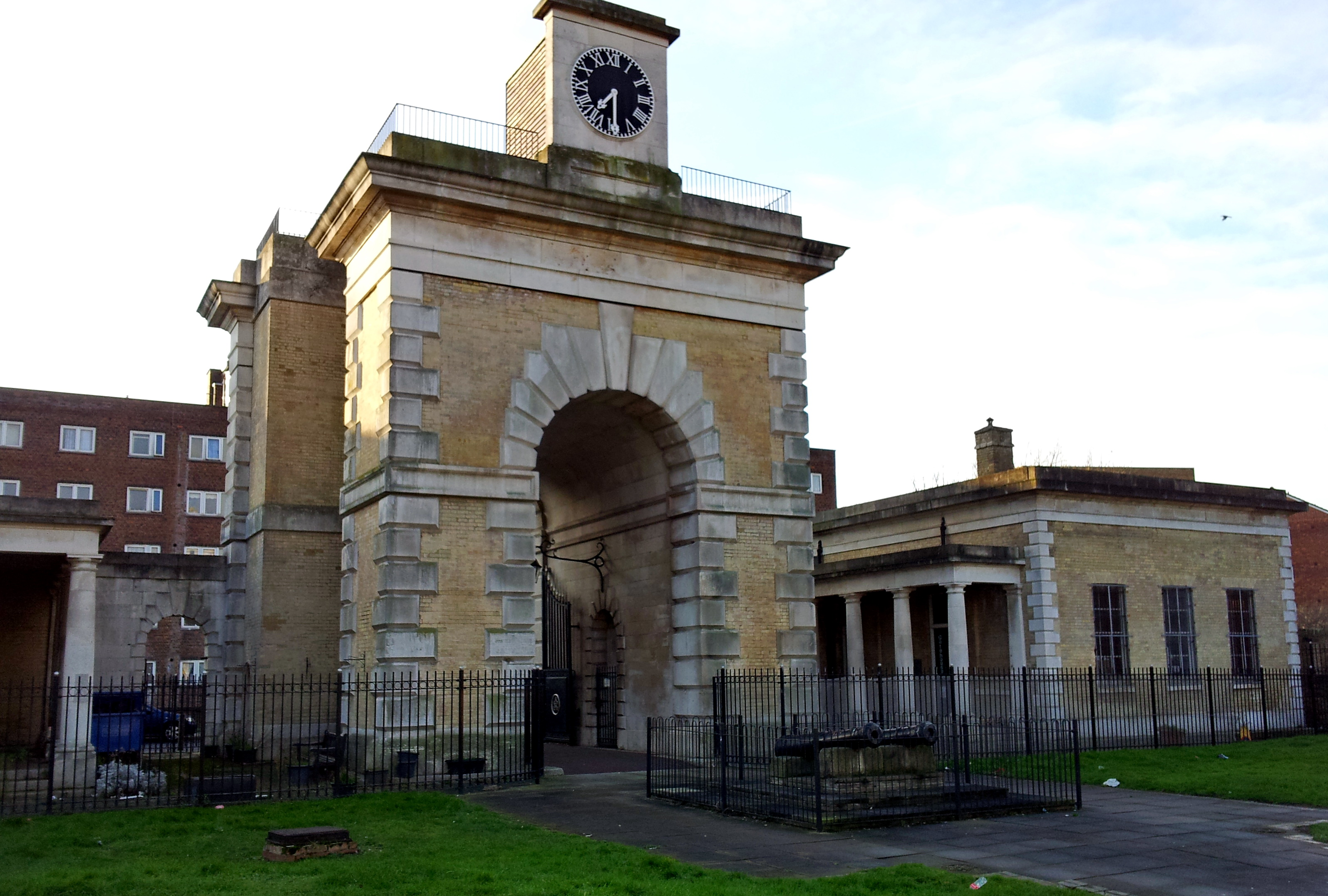
Cambridge Barracks, Woolwich: the surviving gatehouse

The closure of the Dockyard had also led to the Royal Marines vacating their barracks and infirmary on nearby Frances Street. The barracks were renamed Cambridge Barracks, and subsequently housed regiments of infantry; rows of married quarters ('Cardwell Cottages') were built to the north-east in 1872. After closure, the barracks were almost entirely demolished in 1972.

The former infirmary was renamed Red Barracks and went on to serve as the headquarters for what became the Royal Army Ordnance Corps until 1921. From 1885, Artillery College was also based there; it later expanded and was renamed the Military College of Science, before moving out at the start of the Second World War. Later housing the Royal Artillery Records Office and other functions, Red Barracks was demolished in 1975; only the perimeter wall remains. On the northwest corner of Frances Street and Hillreach, opposite the barracks security gate, is the Kings Arms pub, targeted by the IRA in November 1974 in a bombing which killed Royal Artillery Gunner Richard Dunne and another man, and injured 35 others.

== Current units ==
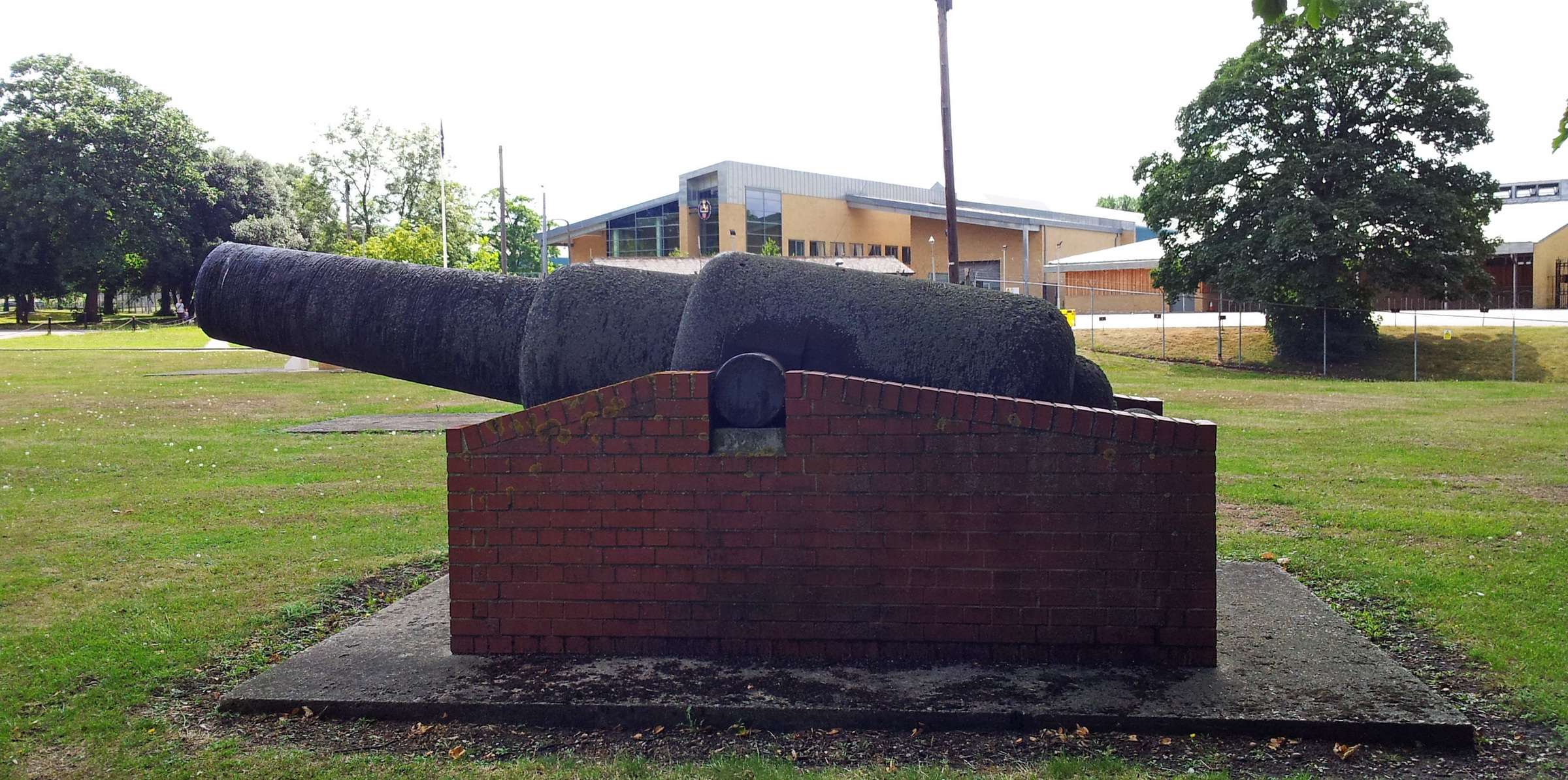
Ornamental gun in front of the new headquarters and stables of the King's Troop RHA (opened in 2012).

Below is a list of the current units which form part of the garrison.

British Army

- Royal Artillery Barracks
  - 1st Battalion, Royal Anglian Regiment
  - 100 (Yeomanry) Regiment Royal Artillery
  - Countess of Wessex's String Orchestra
  - 30 Army Education Centre Group
- Napier Lines
  - King's Troop Royal Horse Artillery

=== Future plans ===
In November 2016 the Ministry of Defence announced that the site would close in 2028, with all army units currently stationed in Woolwich scheduled to be relocated. In 2020, however, it was announced that Napier Lines were to be retained as headquarters of the King's Troop RHA. Nevertheless, in December 2020 Greenwich Borough Council unanimously passed a motion to oppose the sale of the historic barracks. By that time petitions to save the barracks had amassed over 9,000 signatures.

In summer 2026, the 1st Battalion of the Princess of Wales's Royal Regiment will return to Woolwich from their current base in Episkopi, Cyprus.

== See also ==
- Royal School of Artillery

== Census Returns ==
- 1891 UK Census class:RG12. piece:534. folio=66. p. 1. - Woolwich Arsenal Grand Depot Barracks & Cambridge Cottages
