= Royal Artillery Barracks, Woolwich =

Barracks in the Royal Borough of Greenwich in London, England

Royal Artillery Barracks
- Part of Woolwich Garrison
- Woolwich, Greenwich, London in England
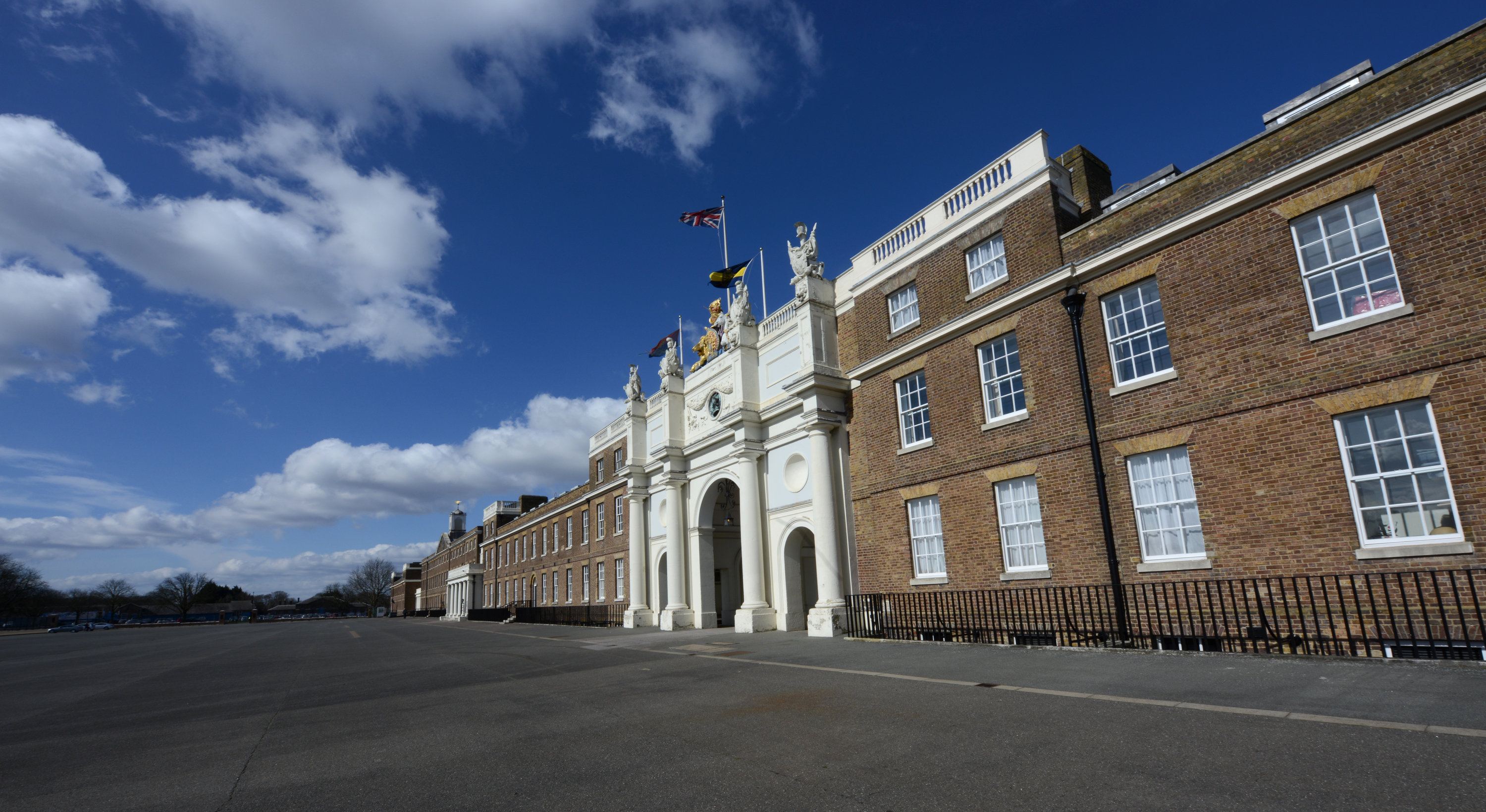
- At 329m the south elevation constitutes the longest continuous architectural composition in London

Site information
- Type: Army barracks
- Owner: Ministry of Defence
- Operator: British Army
- Controlled by: London District
- Condition: Operational

Location
- Location within London
- Coordinates: 51°29′14″N 0°3′31″E
- Area: 103 hectares (250 acres)

Site history
- Built: 1774–1802
- Built for: Board of Ordnance
- Architect: James Wyatt
- In use: 1774 – present
- Events: Terrorist bombings (1981 and 1983); Murder of Lee Rigby (2013)

Garrison information
- Occupants: Princess of Wales's Royal Regiment; King's Troop, Royal Horse Artillery

Listed Building – Grade II*
- Official name: Royal Artillery Barracks Main Building
- Designated: 8 June 1973
- Reference no.: 1078918

Royal Artillery Barracks, Woolwich, is a barracks of the British Army which forms part of Woolwich Garrison. The Royal Regiment of Artillery had its headquarters here from 1776 until 2007, when it was moved to Larkhill Garrison.

== History ==
In 1716 two permanent field companies of Artillery (each of a hundred men) were formed by Royal Warrant and placed under the command of the Master-General of the Ordnance. They were initially quartered in the Warren, about half a mile from the current barracks' site. By 1771 the Royal Regiment of Artillery numbered over 2,400, over a third of whom were usually quartered in Woolwich. Having outgrown its barracks in the Warren, the regiment looked to establish itself in new quarters elsewhere in Woolwich.

=== 18th-century establishment ===
Work on the new barracks began in 1774 on a site overlooking Woolwich Common. As originally built (1774–76) the barracks frontage was only half the present length, being the eastern half of the current south elevation, with the clock pediment and turret positioned centrally. Soldiers were accommodated in the central block, officers in the smaller blocks on either side; the blocks were linked by a pair of brick arcades with large rooms behind: a guard room to the west and an officers' mess to the east. Behind the three blocks was an open yard area and a row of kitchens, with a house for the barrack-master added beyond.

In 1793 the Royal Horse Artillery was formed, and a separate long barracks range was built for them to the north of (and parallel with) the original blocks; it was arranged (cavalry-style) with soldiers on the first floor and stables for the horses below.

=== 19th-century enlargement ===
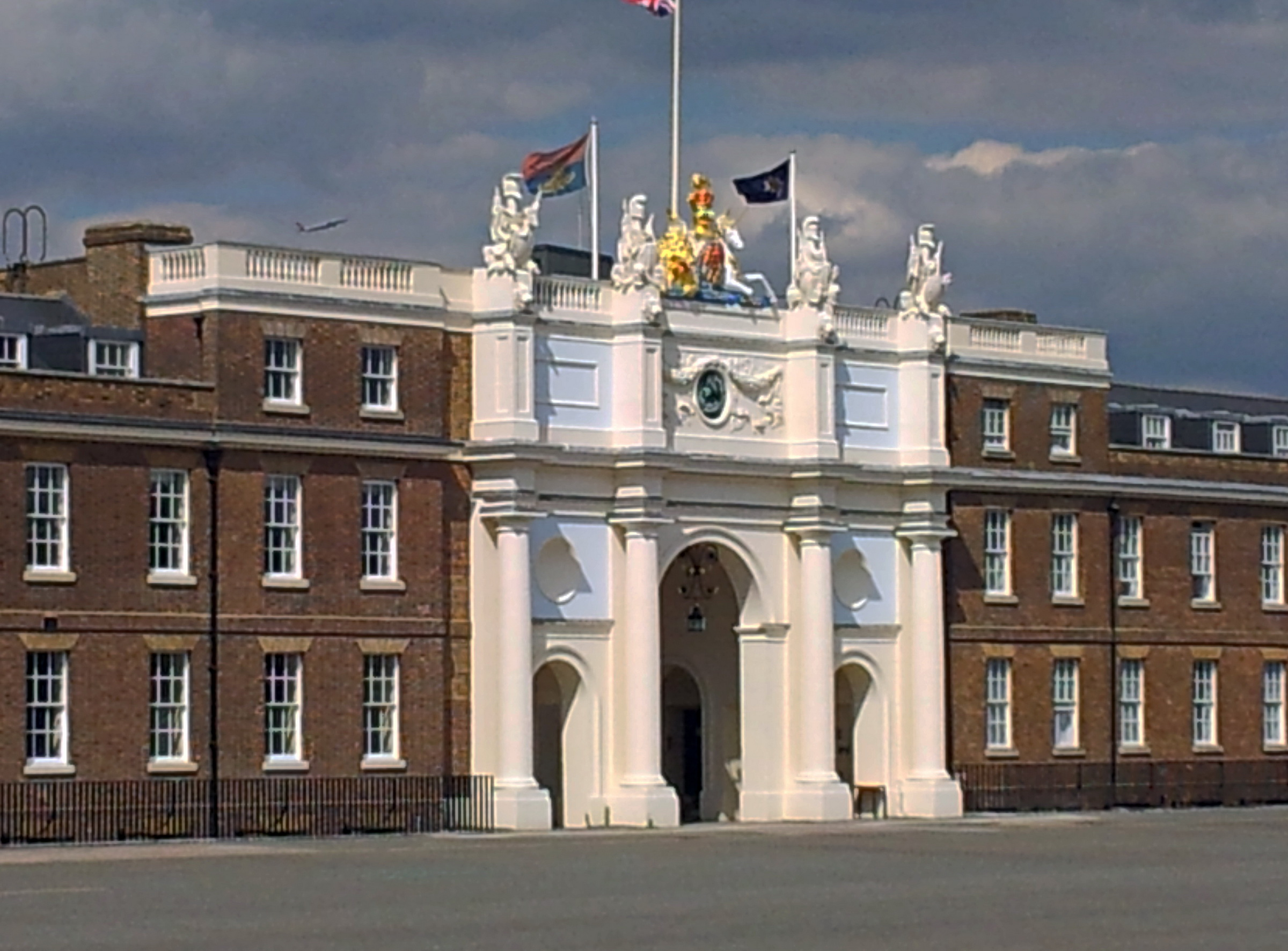
Woolwich Barracks central gateway and parade ground

By the turn of the 19th century the size of the Regiment had grown substantially and larger barracks were needed. To begin with, in 1801, the Horse Artillery barracks was expanded to form a quadrangle by the addition of a parallel range to the north, linked to it by officers' quarters at either end. Beyond this, in what became the north-east corner of the site, a riding school was built with a farriery attached. James Wyatt was the architect commissioned for these works.

Then in 1802–05, the entire barracks was more than doubled in size by erecting something close to a facsimile alongside to the west: in this way the south front was doubled in length by the building of three new blocks (very similar to the first three, but with a wind-dial in place of the clock); and behind these blocks a second Horse Artillery quadrangle was built. Then, to the north of the each quadrangle, a larger, three-storey block was built to provide barrack accommodation for the Corps of Royal Artillery Drivers (again with stables on the ground floor and soldiers' rooms above); these barracks ran along the full length of the northern edge of the site, up as far as the riding school. The south range of the barracks, facing on to the parade ground, was for the foot artillery. Between these and the quadrangles, a number of ancillary buildings and structures were provided, including a coal store, engineers' yard, canteen, stores and office buildings, as well as the barrack-master's house.

For the south front, which faced on to the parade ground, James Wyatt designed a centrepiece triumphal arch to marry the two halves of the frontage together. A companion arch was provided to the north (plainer, but of comparable size), with a central avenue running between the two; and similar arches were placed at either end of each quadrangle (providing a through-route from east to west). On the south façade, Wyatt linked each set of three blocks with colonnades (stuccoed to match the central arch): behind the first he built offices for the regiment's senior officers, behind the next was a new officers' mess ('supposed to be the largest in England', and later expanded in the 1840s); behind the third was the guard room (with a library and reading room added above), and behind the last a regimental chapel. The chapel was a large galleried space, with seating for close to 1,500 (later increased to almost 1,800 with the addition of an upper gallery in 1847). When a new garrison church was built in the 1860s, the chapel within the barracks became redundant, so it was converted to become a theatre for the Royal Artillery Dramatic Society.

The barracks were for the most part completed by 1806; by then they already housed 3,210 officers and men, and 1,200 horses. In 1822 the Corps of Drivers was disbanded, with field artillerymen trained to serve as drivers instead; having thus acquired horses, the Field Artillery moved into the northern range of barracks and stables, leaving the still dismounted Garrison Artillery in the south range. Numbers fluctuated somewhat in the first half of the century: the size of the garrison was reduced during the years of relative peace after Waterloo (until in 1833 the barracks contained just 1,875 men and 419 horses); but it then began growing again. In the census of 1841, a total of 2,862 people were recorded as living in the barracks, of whom 759 were women or children (there being no officially-provided housing for married soldiers at that time). In the wake of the Crimean War, with the army largely garrisoned at home, the barracks became notoriously overcrowded.

In 1851 work began (to a design by Thomas Henry Wyatt) on a new building for the Royal Artillery Institution; it was opened three years later, standing immediately to the north of the easternmost block of the south range of the barracks. The RA Institution was a scientific association, offering officers the opportunity to hear lectures on physics, chemistry, geology, artillery, military tactics and history. The building included a horseshoe-shaped lecture theatre, a library, a laboratory, a museum, and facilities for drawing, sketching, printing, modelmaking and photography. An 'Advanced Course for Artillery Officers' was set up within the Institution in 1864: a two-year examined course of higher scientific study including courses in mathematics (including mechanics and hydrostatics), physics, chemistry, metallurgy, ‘the… steam engine, etc.,’, and Professional Subjects including Guns, Carriages, and Small Arms. Guest lecturers included John Percy in metallurgy, Thomas Minchin Goodeve in physics and practical mechanics, and Charles Loudon Bloxam in chemistry. From 1871 the Department of Artillery Studies made use of the Institution's facilities to provide instruction for all newly-commissioned Artillery officers (with accommodation being provided in the adjacent south-east block of the barracks). In 1885 the Department (together with the Advanced Course) moved to the nearby Red Barracks and was renamed Artillery College.

By the 1880s, the Field Artillery (together with their horses) had been provided with separate barracks accommodation nearby: one brigade in the Hut Barracks, another in the Grand Depot & Engineer Barracks. The Garrison Artillery remained in the south range of the Artillery Barracks (where the District Staff R.A. were also accommodated). The Horse Artillery continued to occupy the two quadrangles. One of the northernmost blocks now housed a cavalry regiment. In 1893–94 a Church of England Soldiers' Institute was built in the north-east corner of the site, providing a concert hall, library and reading room, music room, games rooms and other facilities.

=== 20th-century reconstruction ===
The theatre (the former chapel) burned down in 1903 and was rebuilt to a design by W. G. R. Sprague; and in 1926 a new Regimental Institute was built to replace the canteen (it provided among other facilities a restaurant, a ballroom, a library and a billiards room). Otherwise there were relatively few structural changes during the first half of the century. In the early 1930s, the barracks still housed some 3,000 soldiers, 1,000 horses and between 80 and 200 officers; with mechanisation, the stables were converted into more rooms for soldiers. In 1939 troops were moved out of the barracks, which (along with other facilities in the Woolwich area) was vulnerable to air attack; but the following year it was filled again with evacuees from Dunkirk. Parts of the barracks were damaged during the Blitz, the easternmost block of the south front being destroyed along with the Royal Artillery Institution (which had been inserted behind it in 1851–54).

After World War II, the future of the barracks was kept under discussion. Finally, in 1956, the decision was taken that the Royal Artillery would retain it as their depot, but with everything behind the south front demolished and rebuilt (with the exception of Wyatt's Officers' Mess, which would remain in situ). Over the next ten years twelve new three-storey barrack blocks were erected on the site. Initially, the north, west and east triumphal arches (which were all listed buildings) were retained; those to the east and west were demolished in 1965, to make way for a gym and a computer centre, and three years later the north arch was lost to road widening (a plan that it would be dismantled and re-erected coming to nothing). The retained south range blocks were reconfigured internally, and a replica of the destroyed easternmost block was built. In 1973 the barracks were designated as a Grade II* listed building.

On 23 November 1981, the Provisional Irish Republican Army targeted Government House of the Royal Artillery on Woolwich New Road in a bomb attack which injured two people. In 1983 the barracks itself was targeted, again by the IRA, in a bombing that injured five soldiers.

=== 21st century rebuilding and rundown ===
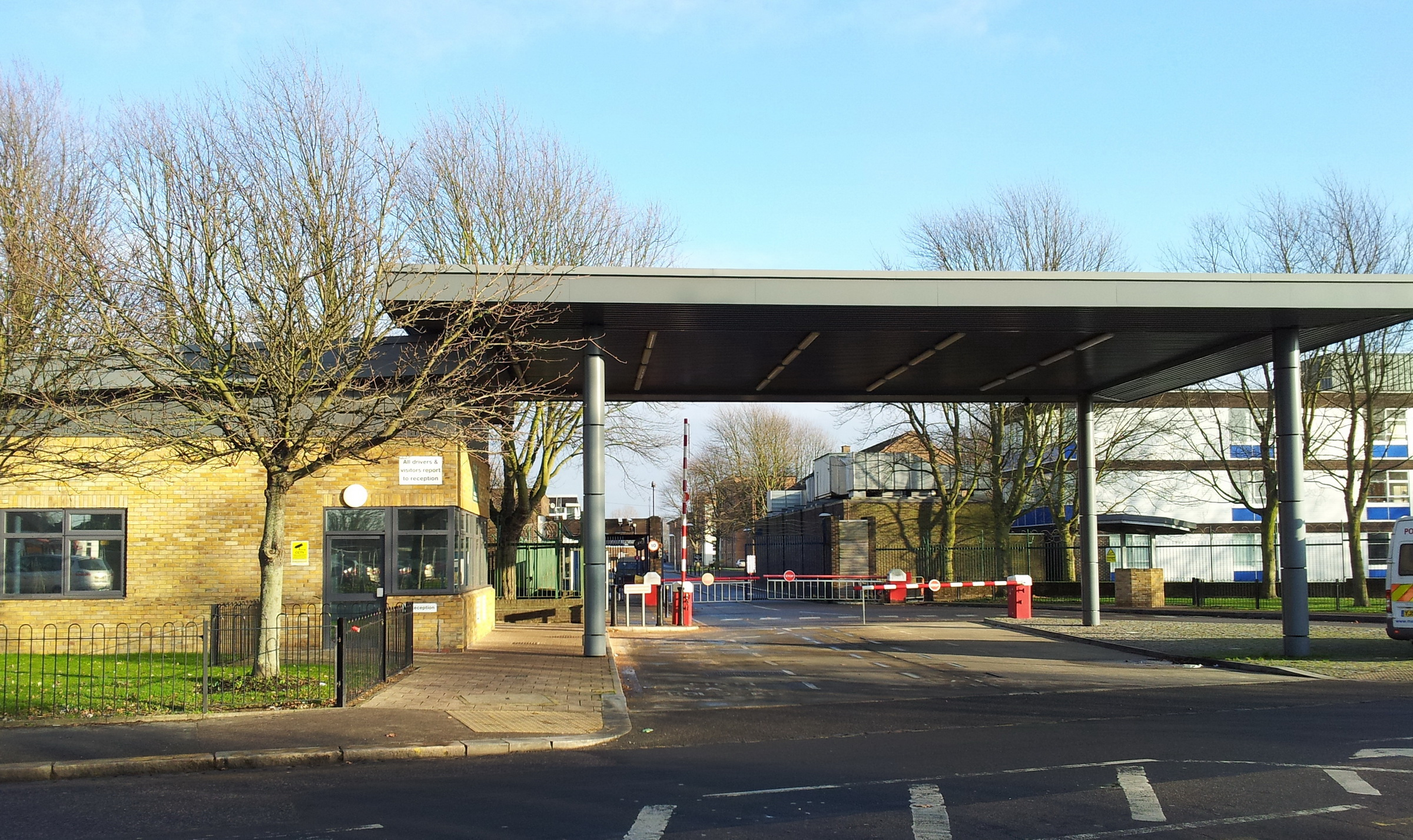
Woolwich Garrison main entrance on Repository Road, SE18

Since the nineteenth century, the appropriateness of Woolwich as a base for the Artillery had been questioned. Suggestions of a move came to nothing until a Defence Estates Review in 2003 proposed a move to Larkhill on Salisbury Plain (where the Royal School of Artillery has been based since 1915). After very nearly 300 years in Woolwich, the last Artillery (the 16th Regiment) left the barracks in July 2007. In 2008–11 the barracks were again largely rebuilt behind the south façade.

The place of the Artillery was taken by the public duties line infantry battalion and incremental companies of the Foot Guards (who moved in from Chelsea Barracks and Cavalry Barracks). Soon afterwards, the Second Battalion the Princess of Wales's Royal Regiment was posted to Woolwich from Cyprus. In 2012, an artillery link was regained when the King's Troop, Royal Horse Artillery, moved from the St John's Wood Barracks to a new headquarters on the Woolwich site, bringing with them a complement of 120 or thereabouts horses, historic gun carriages and artillery pieces used in their displays. Following the departure of the Princess of Wales's Royal Regiment, the First Battalion Royal Anglian Regiment moved into the Barracks in 2014.

On 24 May 2013 Drummer Lee Rigby, of the 2nd Battalion, Royal Regiment of Fusiliers, was murdered by Islamists just outside the Barracks in a terrorist attack. Drummer Rigby was stationed at the barracks.

==== Planned closure ====
In November 2016 the Ministry of Defence announced that the site would close in 2028, with all army units currently stationed in Woolwich scheduled to be relocated. In 2020, it was announced that the adjacent Napier Lines were to be retained as the base of the King's Troop, Royal Horse Artillery. Nevertheless, in December 2020 Greenwich Borough Council unanimously passed a motion to oppose the sale of the historic barracks; by this time petitions to save the barracks had amassed over 9,000 signatures.

== Curtilage ==
=== Parade ground ===
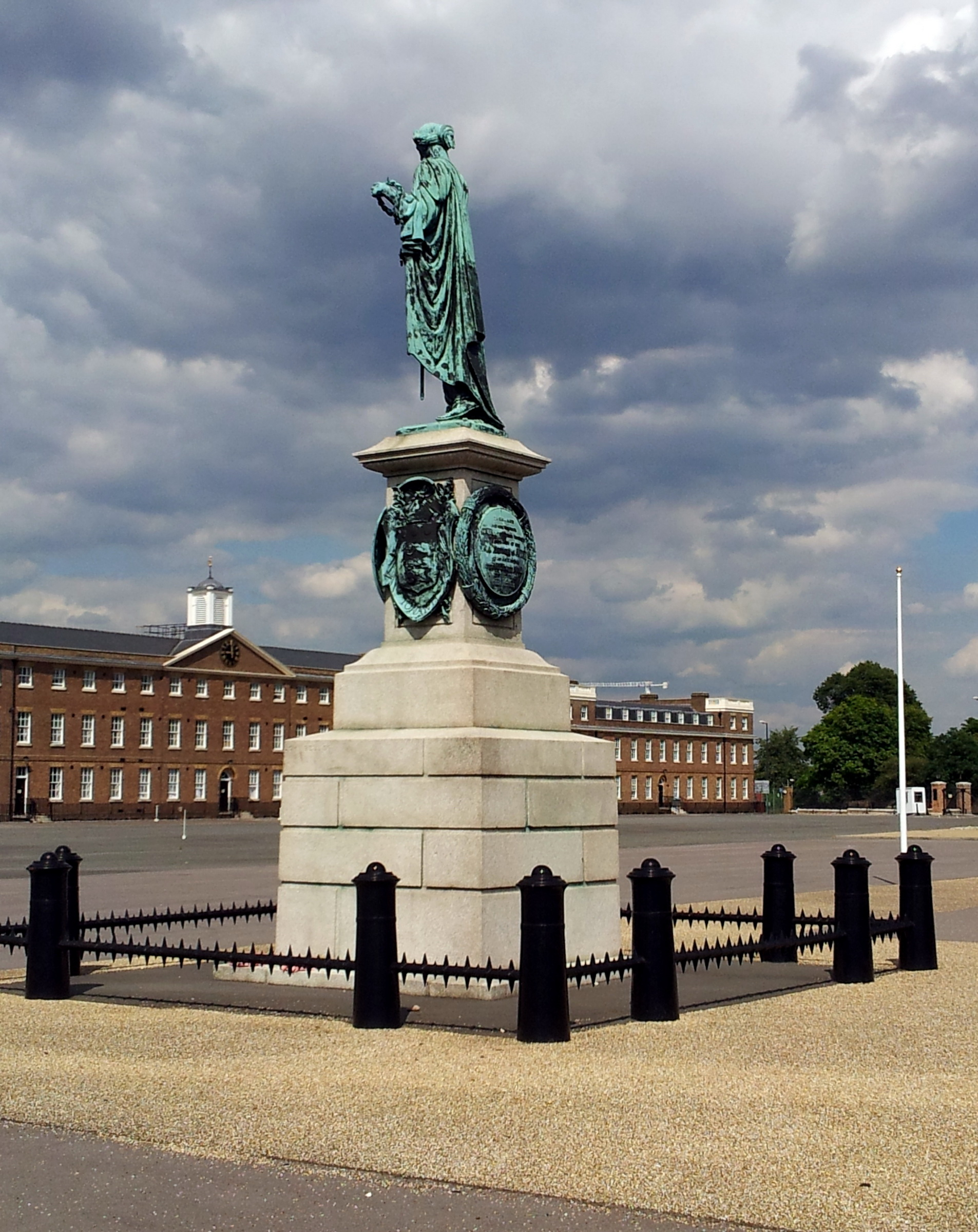
The Crimean War Memorial in front of the parade ground.

In 1784, the land in front of the south range of the barracks was levelled and laid with gravel to form a parade ground. In 1862 a war memorial was 'erected by their comrades to the memory of the Officers, Non-Commissioned Officers and Men of the Royal Regiment of Artillery who fell during the Crimean War in the years 1854, 1855, 1856. Designed by John Bell, the memorial is topped by a large bronze figure of Liberty distributing wreaths from a basket.

For many years the 17.75-ton Bhurtpore gun, captured by Field Marshal the Viscount Combermere after the 1826 siege of Bhurtpore, stood outside the barracks. A set of four Florentine guns dating from the mid-18th century were likewise a fixture on the southern edge of the parade ground for many years. They were all removed to Larkhill in 2007, along with other historic cannons which had stood in front of the barracks.

In 2008, for the benefit of the public duties units moving to the barracks, the central part of the parade ground was extended so as to assume the same dimensions as Horse Guards Parade.

=== Barrack Field ===
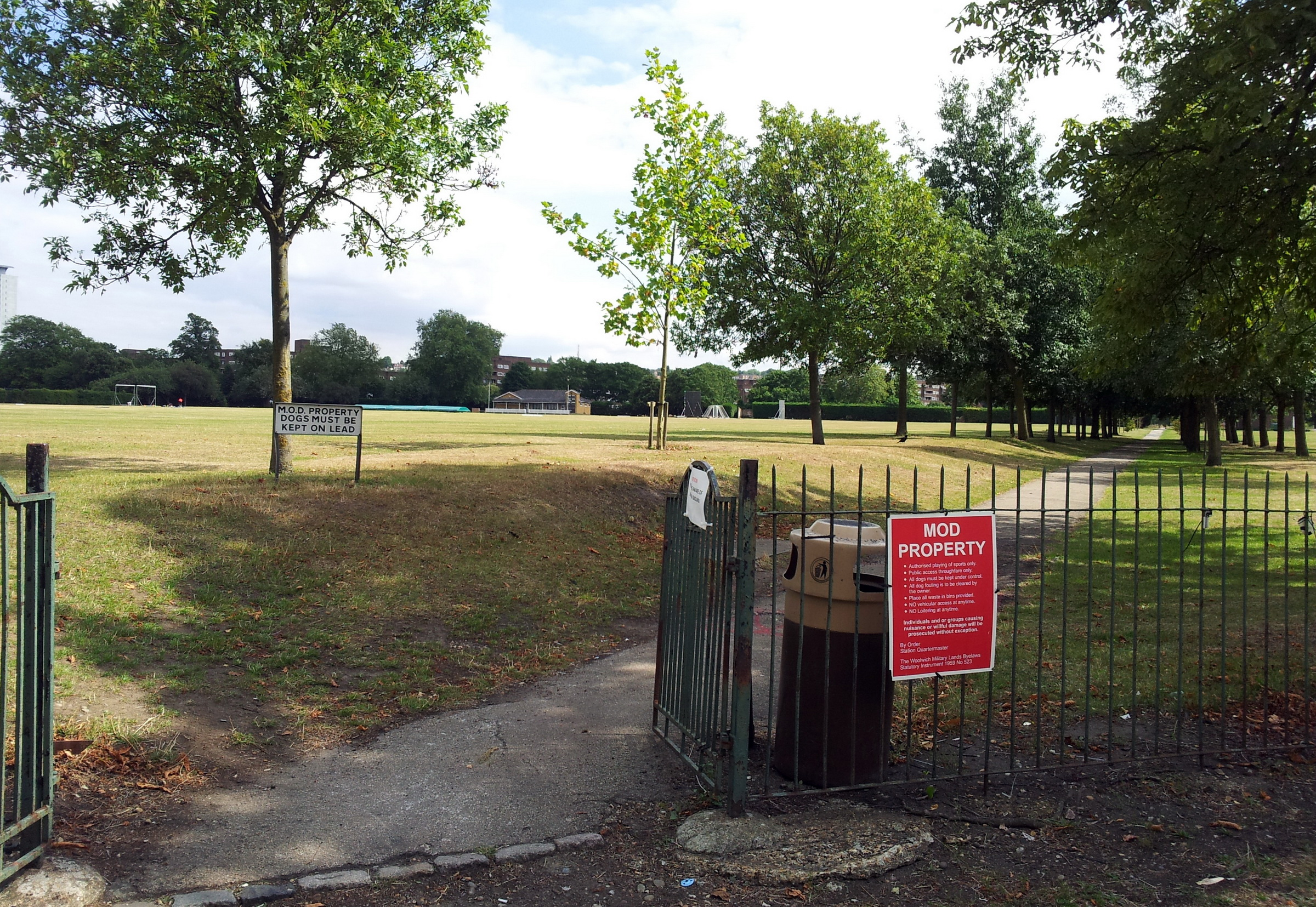
Barrack Field with public access path

Barrack Field, to the south of the Parade Ground, originally formed part of the Bowater Estate (along with the plot on which the Barracks themselves were erected). Having acquired the land, the Board of Ordnance in 1778 built a ha-ha along its southern boundary, to prevent livestock from straying on to it from the Common. By 1806 the Board had acquired ownership of Woolwich Common, and the line of the ha-ha was shifted further south as a way of straightening the boundary. Since then, the Barrack Field (together with the Common) has been used for various military purposes, including artillery exercises, physical training and large-scale military parades. The Royal Artillery Cricket Club has played on a cricket ground here (dating from the 18th century); and to the east there were tennis courts and football pitches at various times. During the First World War the Barrack Field was used as a mobilization camp with over 200 tents. During the Second World War part of it was turned into allotments.

=== Gun Park ===
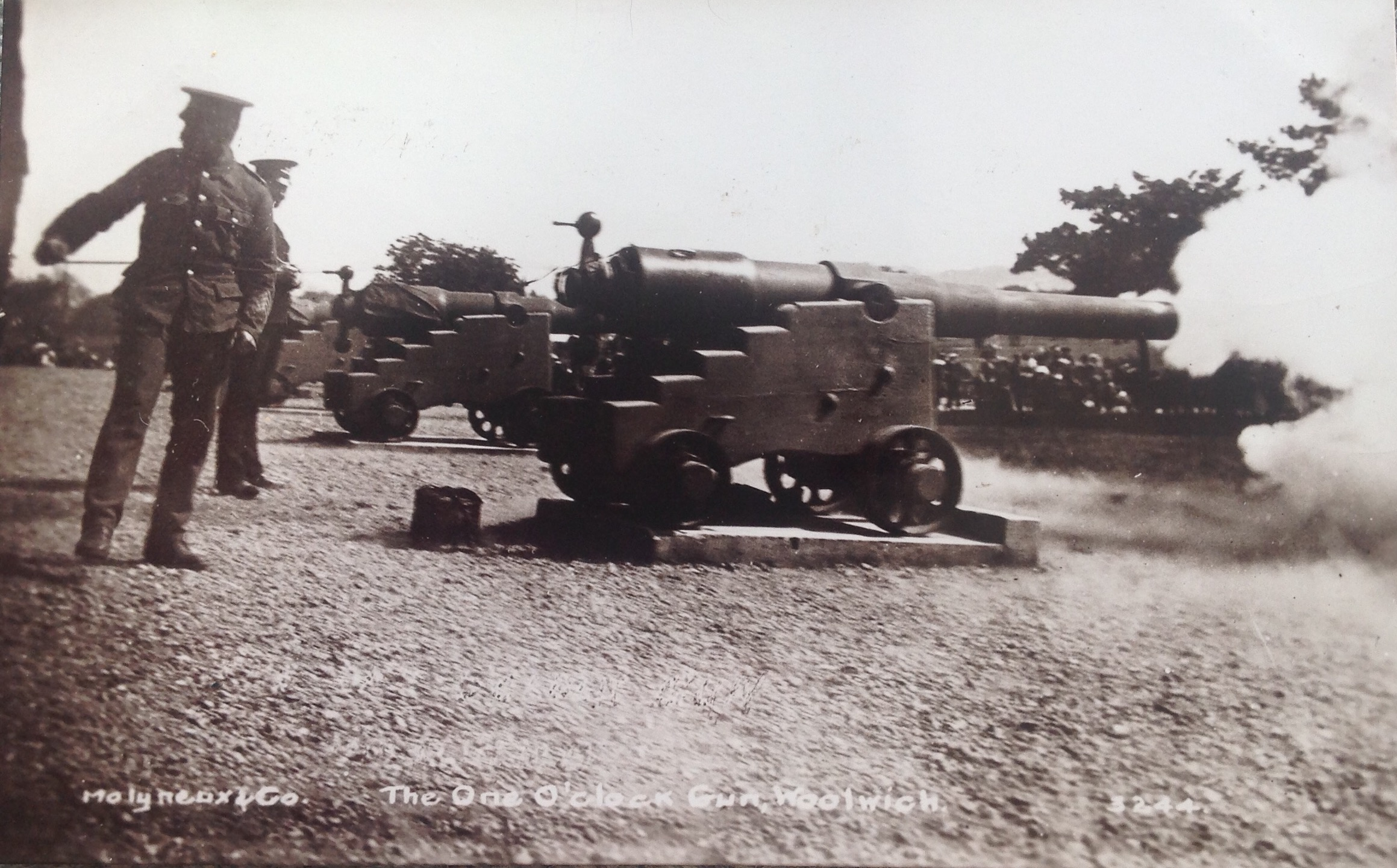
Firing of the 1 o'clock gun, Woolwich (RBL 40-pounder).

In 1803 the Board of Ordnance built a mortar battery for artillery training, immediately to the west of the parade ground. The battery was orientated to fire in a south-southeast direction, the target being a flagstaff positioned three-quarters of a mile away at the southern end of the common. A pedimented building, which still stands nearby, served as an ammunition store and shifting room. As described in 1846, live-fire mortar and howitzer practice took place at the battery 'every Monday, Wednesday and Friday [from] as early as half past nine in the morning'; live-fire gun practice, on the other hand, continued to take place in the Royal Arsenal (on a firing range near the proof butts). Use of the mortar battery ended in the 1870s, when live artillery firing was restricted to Plumstead Marshes and Shoeburyness.

Immediately north of the mortar battery the Gun Park was laid out (later known as the Upper Gun Park): it was a drill ground for field-battery exercises, around which gun-carriage sheds were built to the north and west. Firing positions for six guns were also provided, immediately to the south of the mortar battery. These were used as a saluting battery; guns were fired from here daily at 1 p.m. and at 9.30 p.m. to announce 'the time of day [...] to the garrison and neighbourhood of Woolwich'. It remained in use for gun salutes for much of the 20th century and, as reported in 1970, the 'firing of the 1 o'clock gun from the Greenhill Battery' continued to take place daily. Later the guns were removed and placed in front of the Royal Military Academy; but their footings remain, along with several surviving carriage sheds and other buildings, around the edge of the former drill ground (now used as a car park).

The Gun Park Block on the west side of the drill ground is a Grade II listed building.

== See also ==
- List of British Army installations
- Royal School of Artillery
- Woolwich Garrison
