= Gun Park Block, Royal Artillery Barracks =

Gun Park Block

General information
- Architectural style: Georgian
- Location: Repository Road, Woolwich, London SE18
- Coordinates: 51.4853°N 0.0566°E
- Construction started: Early 19th century

The Gun Park Block is a Grade II listed building on Repository Road in Woolwich, in the Royal Borough of Greenwich, south-east London. It is an early 19th-century military building within the curtilage of the Royal Artillery Barracks, situated at the edge of the former Gun Park drill ground on Woolwich Common.

== Description ==
The building is a single-storey, five-bay structure in multicoloured stock brick with a brick plinth. The three centre bays project slightly beneath a pediment with a stone cornice above brick dentils. In the tympanum is a round window with wood louvres and a gauged brick surround. The roof is low-pitched, hipped and slated, with brick dentil cornices at the eaves continuing across the front below the pediment.

The windows are round-headed, set in round-arched recesses with a stone impost band, all with gauged brick arches. They contain sash windows with glazing bars, radial in the heads. The entrance has an arched door opening with a double door beneath a cornice head, and a radial fanlight with outer margin lights. At either side is a lower, single-storey, three-window wing.

== Setting ==
The Gun Park Block stands on the west side of Repository Road, at the edge of the former Gun Park, a drill ground for field-battery exercises laid out alongside the parade ground of the Royal Artillery Barracks. To the west lie the former Repository Grounds, where the Royal Military Repository relocated from the Warren in 1802 to establish an artillery training landscape. The Rotunda, a Grade II* listed structure designed by John Nash, was resited from Carlton House to the eastern edge of the Repository Grounds in 1818–20.

== Listing and future ==
The building was listed at Grade II on 8 June 1973. It lies within the Woolwich Common Conservation Area.

The Royal Artillery departed Woolwich in 2007, with the Regiment's headquarters moving to Larkhill. In November 2016 the Ministry of Defence announced that the barracks site would close in 2028. A supplementary planning document for the barracks site, prepared by the Royal Borough of Greenwich and the Defence Infrastructure Organisation, identified the Gun Park Block as a heritage asset that should be refurbished for active use and treated as a visual focal point framed by new development.

== See also ==
- Royal Artillery Barracks, Woolwich
- Rotunda, Woolwich
- Woolwich Common
- Royal Artillery Museum
- Repository Woods

== Sources ==
- "Royal Artillery Barracks Gun Park Block". Historic England.
- Guillery, Peter, ed. (2012). "Royal Artillery Barracks and Royal Military Repository Areas". Survey of London. Vol. 48: Woolwich. Yale University Press. ISBN 978-0-300-18722-9.
- Chamberlain, Darryl (7 October 2025). "Woolwich Barracks could host 1,900 homes – but not Greenwich's archives". The Greenwich Wire.
