= Driver (rank) =

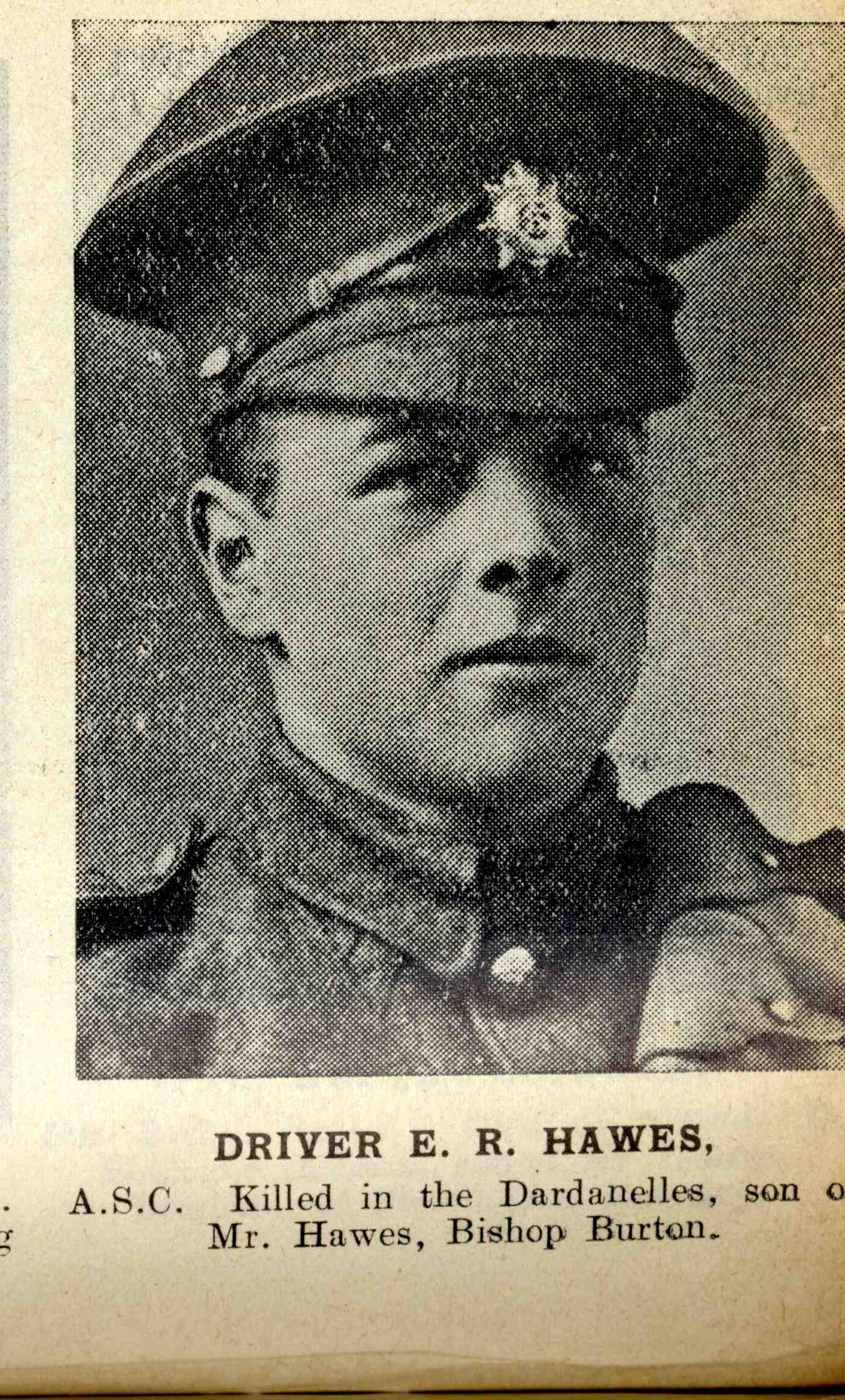
Driver E. R. Hawes, Army Service Corps, killed in action in the First World War.

Driver (Dvr) was a military rank used in the British Army and the armies of other Commonwealth countries. It was the lowest enlisted rank, equivalent to private or gunner.

The Corps of Royal Artillery Drivers provided drivers for the horse teams that moved the field guns of the British Army until 1822 when it was merged into the Royal Artillery. The Royal Horse Artillery had always maintained its own drivers. The motorisation of the army led to the requirement for a distinction between horse team driver (Dvr RA), those who operated internal combustion machines (Dvr IC), those who also operated radio systems (Dvr Op) and those who were also mechanics (Dvr Mech). The rank was phased out after the First World War when all Royal Artillerymen of the lowest rank were redesignated as gunners.

The rank was also used in the Royal Flying Corps, Royal Australian Artillery and Royal Canadian Artillery.

It was also used by all the private-equivalents of the Royal Army Service Corps and later the Royal Corps of Transport, no matter what their trade. When the RCT amalgamated to form the Royal Logistic Corps in 1993 the rank finally disappeared from the British Army.

== See also ==
- Corps of Royal Artillery Drivers
