= Royal Marine Barracks, Woolwich =

Military installation for the Royal Marines

Royal Marine Barracks, Woolwich
- Frances Street, Woolwich, London
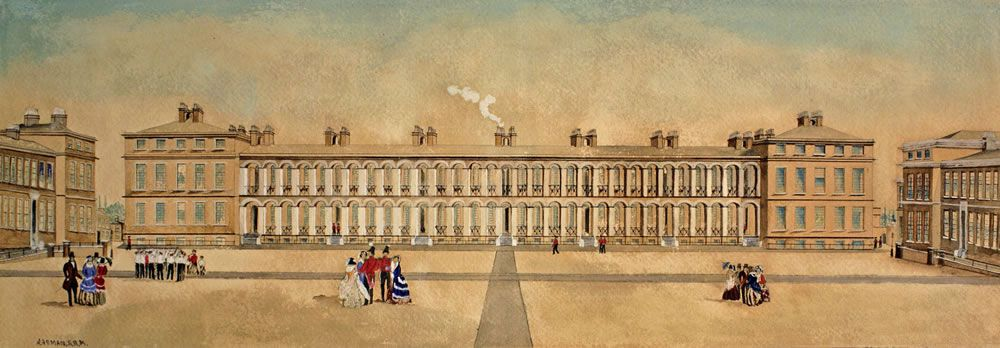
- Royal Marine Barracks Woolwich as viewed from the Frances Street gate

Site information
- Type: Royal Marines Base

Location
- Location within London
- Coordinates: 51.48856°N 0.05560°E

Site history
- Built: 1842–1848
- Built for: Admiralty
- In use: 1848–1972

Garrison information
- Occupants: Woolwich Division, Royal Marines

The Royal Marine Barracks, Woolwich was a military installation occupied by the Royal Marines and located in Frances Street, just south of Woolwich Dockyard. After the Royal Marines' departure from Woolwich it was renamed Cambridge Barracks, while the adjacent Royal Marine Infirmary was renamed Red Barracks.

== History ==
=== Royal Marine Barracks ===
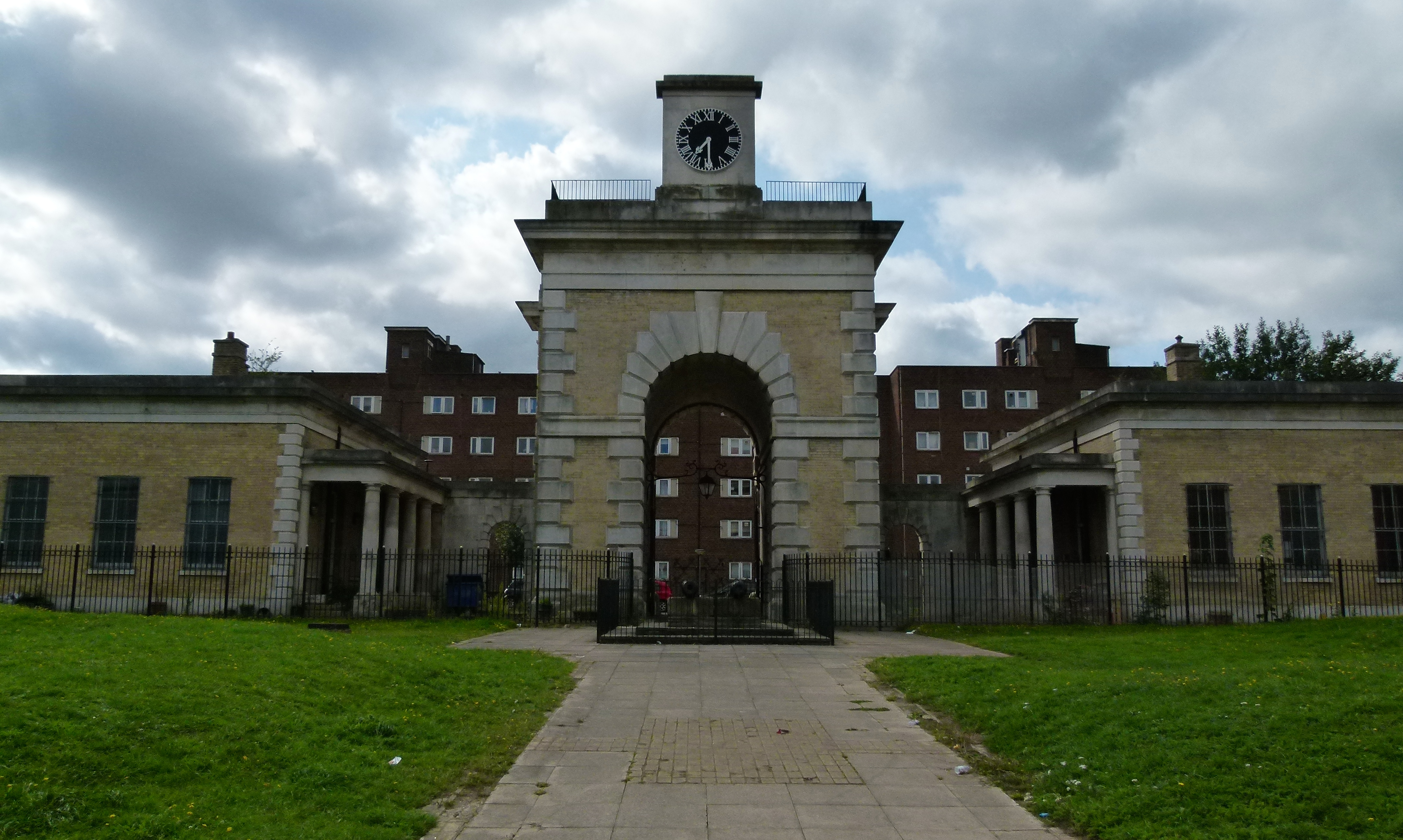
Gatehouse to the former Royal Marine Barracks (later known as Cambridge Barracks)

The Woolwich Division of the Royal Marines was established, as part of the response to the threat created by the Napoleonic Wars, in 1805. New barracks for marines, who provided a military presence in the Dockyard, were established east of Frances Street in 1808. Bowater Cottage, which had been built in the 1790s, became the home of the Colonel Commandant of the barracks in 1812. The barracks were re-built, to a design developed Captain William Denison RE, between 1842 and 1848. They were of an enlightened design for their time, built to provide even the lowest-ranked inhabitants with sufficient light, space and fresh air. Rushgrove House, which had been built in 1806, became the home of the Colonel Commandant of the barracks in 1855. The Royal Marine Infirmary was erected to the northwest of the barracks in 1860.

=== Cambridge Barracks ===
After the closure of the Dockyard and the consequential disbanding of the Woolwich Division of the Royal Marines in 1869, these Royal Marine Barracks were renamed Cambridge Barracks, after the Commander-in-Chief of the Forces, Prince George, Duke of Cambridge, and used by the British Army as additional troop accommodation. Having become surplus to requirements, the barracks were demolished in 1972, but the heavily rusticated gatehouse arch remains on Frances Street, serving as a community centre and police office. The site was subsequently redeveloped for housing.

== Sources ==
- "The Survey of London: Volume 48: Woolwich" (PDF). English Heritage. 2012.
