= Royal Horse Artillery =

Military unit of the British Army

- Cypher of the Royal Horse Artillery
- Active: 1 February 1793 – present
- Allegiance: United Kingdom
- Branch: British Army
- Type: Horse artillery
- Role: The King's Troop - Ceremonial; 1st Regiment - Field Artillery; 3rd Regiment - Field Artillery; 7th Regiment - Airborne Artillery
- Size: Three Regiments and one Ceremonial Battery plus affiliated Reserve Units
- Part of: Royal Artillery
- Garrison/HQ: The King's Troop - London; 1st Regiment - Larkhill; 3rd Regiment - Newcastle Upon Tyne; 7th Regiment - Colchester
- Mottos: French: Honi soit qui mal y pense "Shamed be whoever thinks ill of it."
- March: Bonnie Dundee (Gallop march); The Keel Row (Trot March); The Royal Artillery Slow March sometimes referred to as Duchess of Kent March (walk march)

Commanders
- Captain General, Royal Artillery: The King
- Colonel Commandant: General Sir Alexander Harley, KBE, CB

Insignia
- Tactical Recognition Flash

The Royal Horse Artillery (RHA) was formed in 1793 as a distinct arm of the Royal Regiment of Artillery (commonly termed Royal Artillery) to provide horse artillery support to the cavalry units of the British Army. Although the cavalry link remained part of its defining character, as early as the Battle of Waterloo the RHA was sometimes deployed more along the lines of conventional field artillery, fighting from comparatively fixed positions.

The Royal Horse Artillery, currently consists of three regiments, (1 RHA, 3 RHA and 7 RHA) and one ceremonial unit (King's Troop, Royal Horse Artillery). Almost all the batteries of the Royal Horse Artillery have served continuously since the French Revolutionary Wars or Napoleonic Wars, except the King's Troop, created in 1946, and M Battery, which was 'reanimated' in 1993. Horses are still in service for ceremonial purposes but were phased out from operational deployment in the 1930s.

== History ==
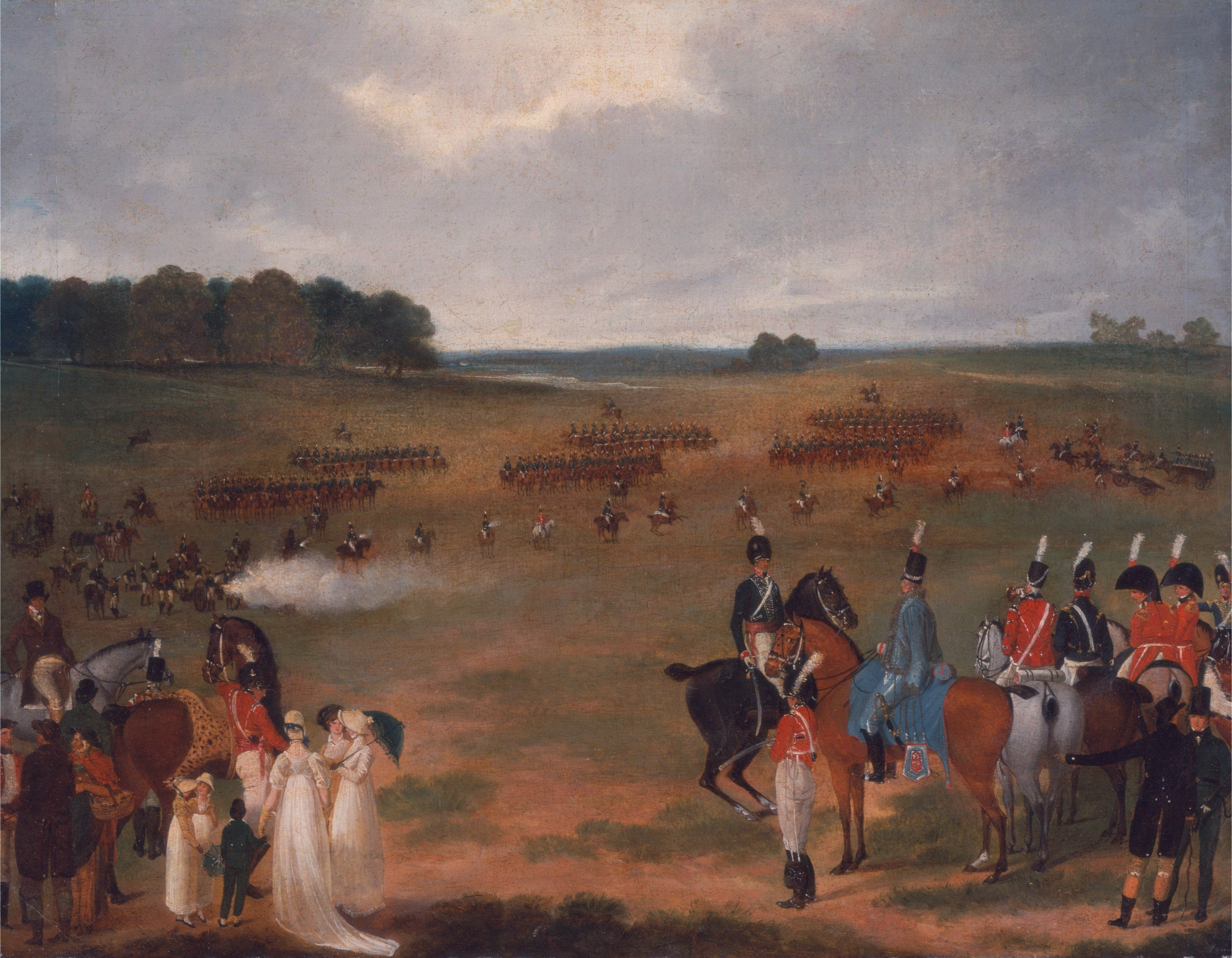
1804 painting of Royal Horse Artillery units being reviewed in Hyde Park

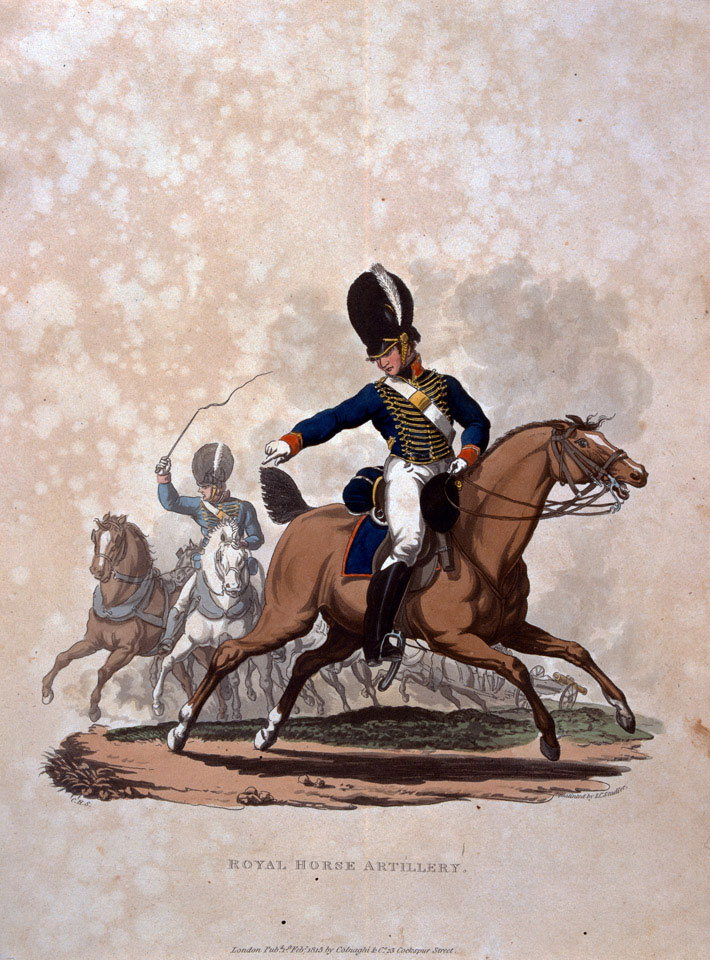
1812 engraving of a Royal Horse Artillery artillery train

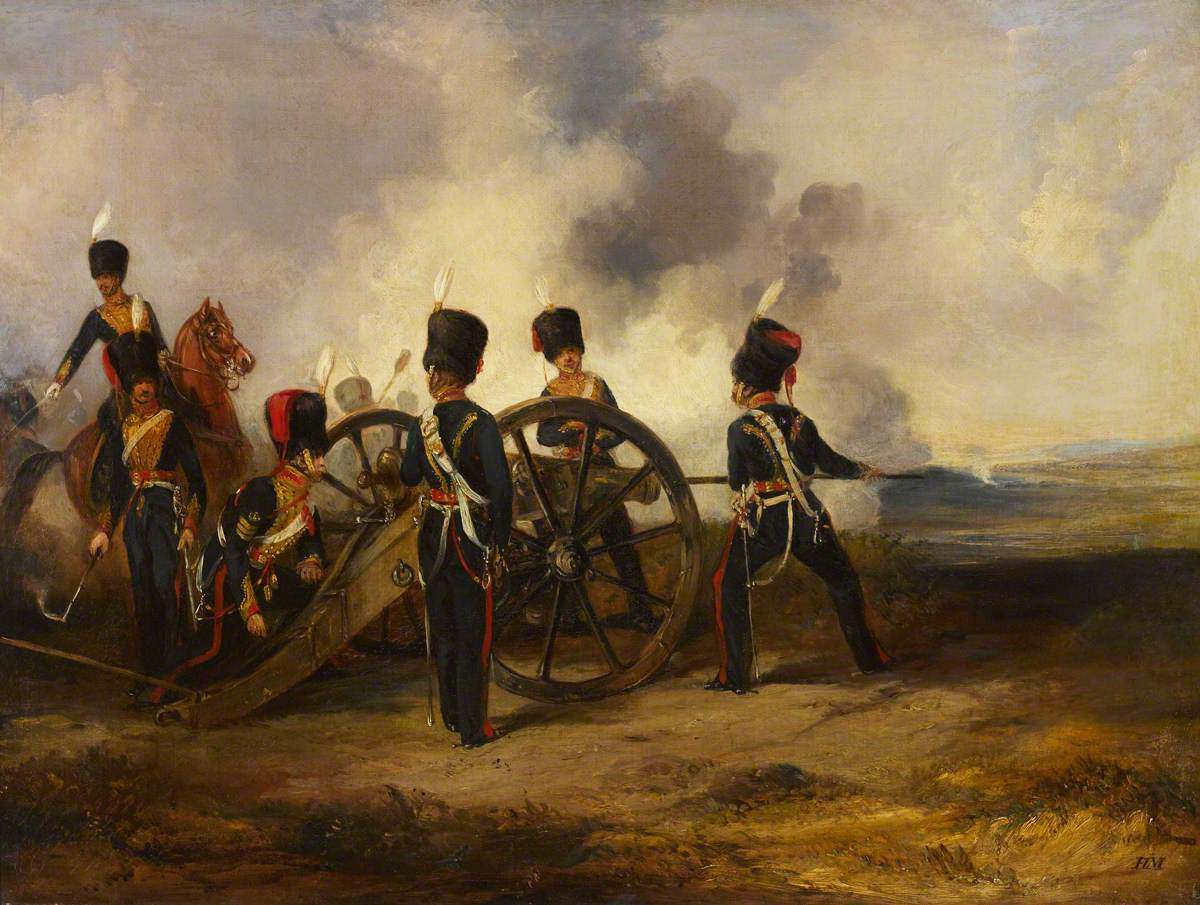
c. 1844 painting of a Royal Horse Artillery gun crew loading their gun

On 1 February 1793, Revolutionary France declared war on Britain, bringing the British into the French Revolutionary Wars. Britain went on to be at war with France for over two decades, during which time significant progress was achieved in artillery development. The first two troops of Horse Artillery (A – later entitled "The Chestnut Troop" – and B) were raised in January 1793 at Goodwood, West Sussex, by the Master-General of the Ordnance, the 3rd Duke of Richmond, to provide fire support for the cavalry. They were joined by two more troops in November 1793. Each troop had six 6-pounder guns. Another development was the formation of a headquarters staff providing a channel between the regiment and the Board of Ordnance. Captain John Macleod was the first brigade major and became the first deputy-adjutant-general in 1795. By 1806, eleven troops had been formed, with ten companies of the Royal Irish Artillery incorporated, as the Seventh Battalion, after the union with Ireland in 1801. The Royal Regiment of Artillery was not part of the British Army at this time, but part of the establishment of the Board of Ordnance, with the Master-General its commanding officer; only after the Board's abolition in 1855 did the Artillery become part of the British Army under the Commander-in-Chief of the Forces.

All RHA personnel were mounted. Included in the establishment were 45 drivers and 187 horses, making it the first self-contained fighting unit of artillery. Initially, there was a clear distinction between the mounted Royal Horse Artillery and the rest of the Royal Artillery, who were dismounted. Whenever horses were needed for the rest of the Artillery (as they routinely were, to move field guns from place to place) they had to be hired along with civilian drivers. This was problematic, so in 1794 a separate Corps of Royal Artillery Drivers was raised (which did not affect the self-contained Royal Horse Artillery, but provided ready teams of draught horses and drivers for the field artillery units). After Waterloo, the Corps of Drivers was disbanded, and instead, artillerymen were trained as drivers, which gave the field artillery mounted status. When the Royal Artillery split into separate units in 1899, the term 'Mounted Branch' was used to refer collectively to the Royal Horse Artillery and the Royal Field Artillery, while 'Dismounted Branch' referred to the Royal Garrison Artillery. The Royal Horse Artillery was, distinguished from the Field Artillery by (among other things) its speed: the need to keep pace with a cavalry charge was achieved initially by the Horse Artillery using lighter guns than the RFA, and later by their using proportionally more horses.

The regiment wore light cavalry uniforms of blue with gold lace and red facings. Their overalls were grey with a red stripe and on their heads they wore the distinctive Tarleton helmets. If needed, they carried 1796 light-cavalry sabres or their own semi-official RHA 1796P sabre.

The RHA participated in the major wars of two centuries, including the Napoleonic Wars, the War of 1812, the Indian Mutiny, the Crimean War, the Peninsular War, the Anglo-Zulu War, the Boer War, World War I and World War II.

In 1859, the term "battalion" was replaced by "brigade". This was in turn replaced by "regiment" in 1939. The five Horse Artillery brigades consisted of two batteries each. Between 1899 and 1924, the Royal Artillery was divided with the creation of the Royal Field Artillery, which utilised horses for its medium-calibre guns.

When the Territorial Force was created in 1908, artillery units of the old Volunteer Force were converted into foot, horse, and garrison batteries. There were 14 batteries of horse artillery, 12 of which belonged to the RHA, the remaining two being provided by the Honourable Artillery Company. Territorial batteries were of four guns each rather than the six guns of regular batteries. The principal weapon of Territorial RHA units was the Ordnance QF 15 pounder, although the Ordnance BLC 15 pounder was issued to some second-line RHA units formed in 1914.

At the outbreak of World War I the regular RHA comprised twenty-five batteries, eleven of those serving in India with the Indian Army. They were equipped with the Ordnance QF 13 pounder.

In the 1920s, development of trucks and track vehicles brought an end to operational use of horses. By 1927, medium artillery was drawn by tractors instead of heavy draught horses. By 1937, nine field brigades had been mechanised as well as a brigade of RHA. The last battery to be mechanised was K Battery, in 1939. Today, the ceremonial King's Troop alone retains the use of the mounted batteries.

At the onset of World War II, recruits were instructed that "the role of the Royal Artilleryman is, as it has ever been, to fight his gun, forgetful of self, to the last round in support of other arms."

== Current regiments ==
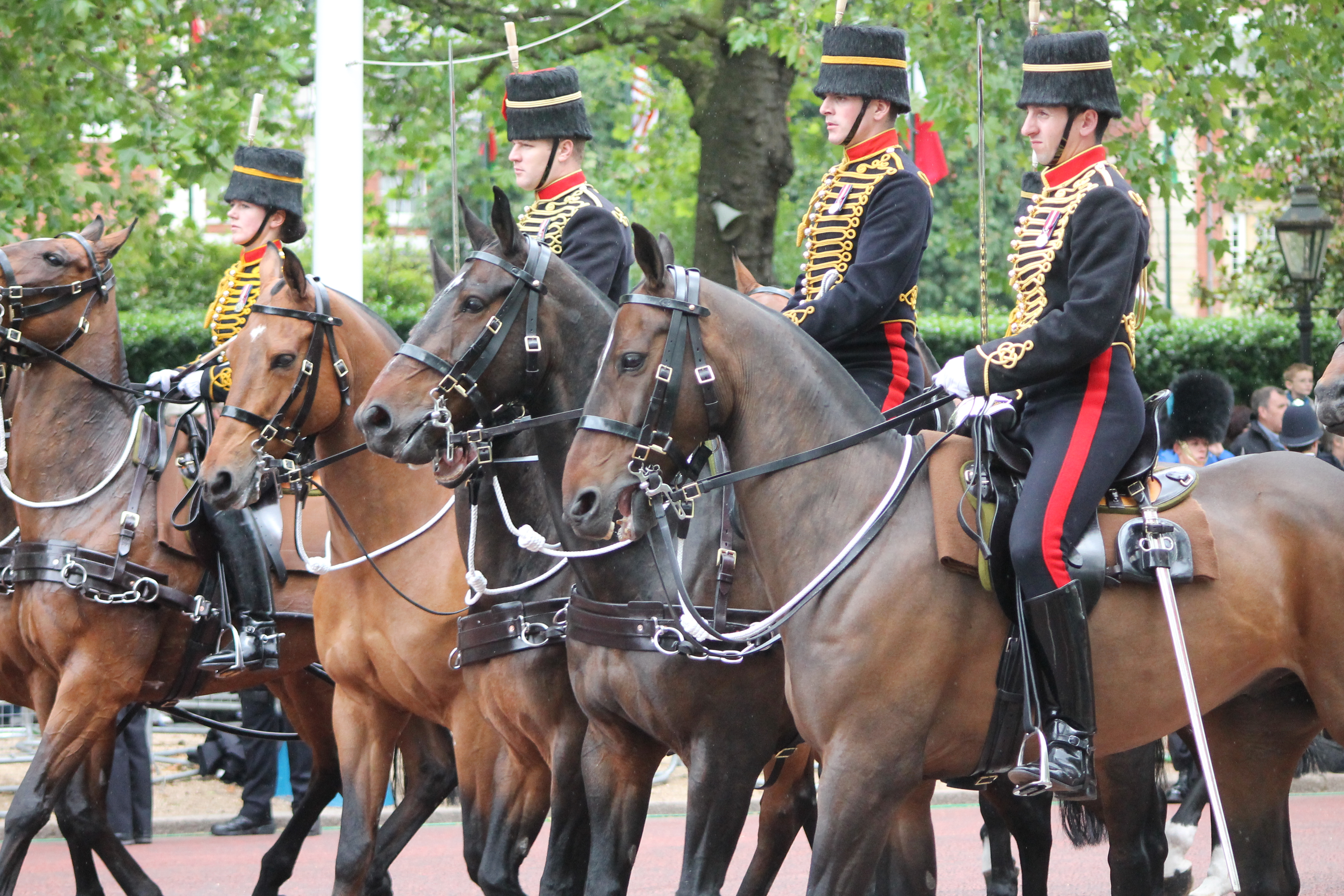
The King's Troop, Royal Horse Artillery at the 2012 Trooping the Colour

The following are current units of the Royal Horse Artillery:

- The King's Troop, Royal Horse Artillery, based at King George VI Lines, Royal Artillery Barracks, Woolwich
- 1st Regiment Royal Horse Artillery based at Larkhill Garrison, Larkhill, as self-propelled field artillery
- 3rd Regiment Royal Horse Artillery based at Albemarle Barracks, Harlow Hill, as light field artillery
- 7th Parachute Regiment Royal Horse Artillery based at Merville Barracks, Colchester Garrison, as parachute field artillery (augmented as necessary by A (1st City of London) Battery, Honourable Artillery Company)

The Royal Horse Artillery provided the Queen's Guard on four occasions:

- 1 RHA – January 1979, 2016 and May 2026
- 7 Para RHA – March 1989
- King's Troop – April 2007

The King's Troop provides the King's Life Guard in Whitehall for three weeks in August each year while the Household Cavalry Mounted Regiment goes away for summer training.

== Alliances ==
- Canada – Royal Canadian Horse Artillery

== Order of precedence ==
When on parade with its guns, the Royal Horse Artillery takes precedence over all. Without its guns, the Household Cavalry alone precedes the RHA.

| Preceded by Household Cavalry | Order of Precedence | Succeeded by Royal Armoured Corps |

== See also ==
- List of Royal Artillery Batteries
