= Corps of Royal Artillery Drivers =

British Army corps, 1793–1822

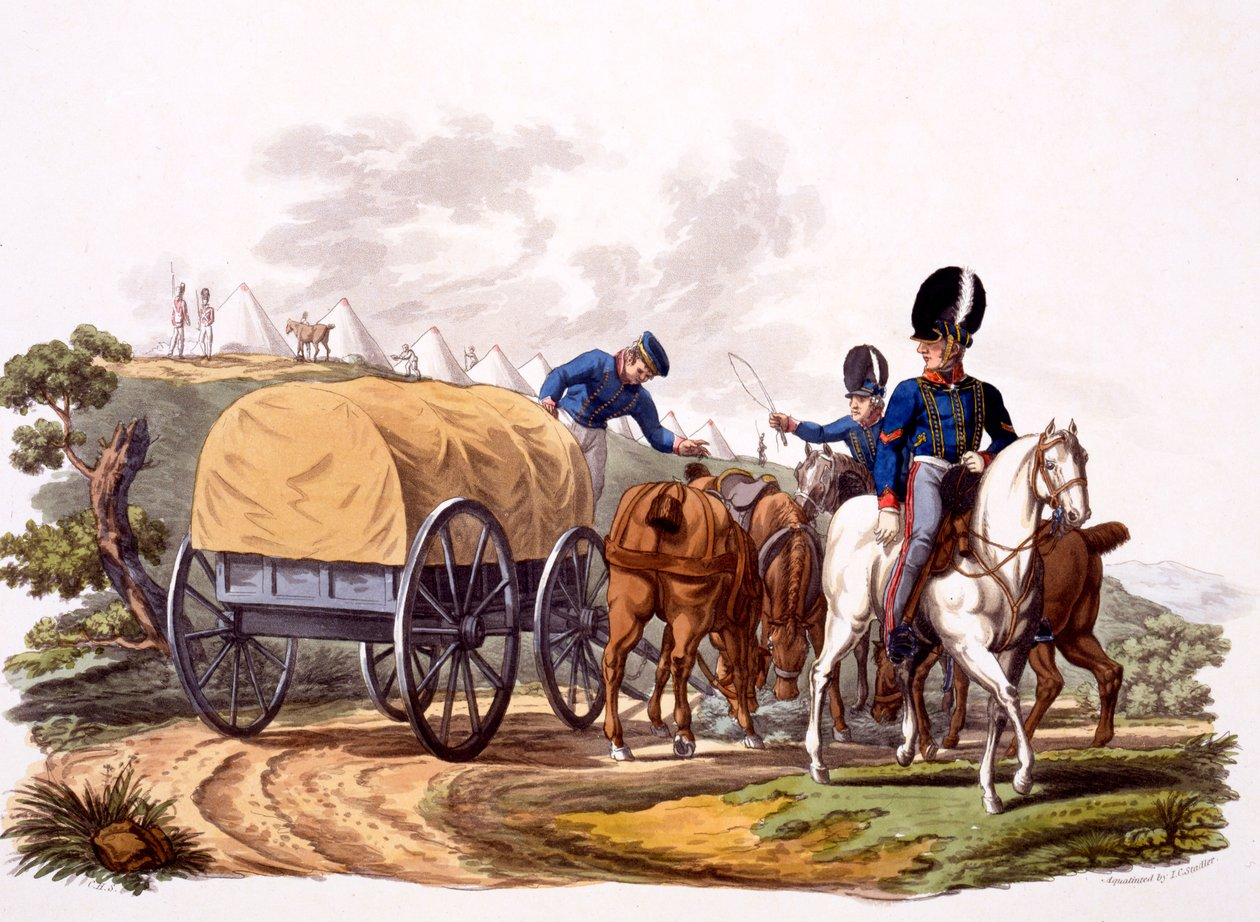
- 1812 engraving of the corps
- Active: 1793–1822
- Country: Great Britain; United Kingdom
- Branch: British Army
- Type: Artillery
- Role: Logistics
- Size: Circa 7,400 men
- Engagements: French Revolutionary Wars; Napoleonic Wars

The Corps of Royal Artillery Drivers was a corps of the British Army raised in 1793 as the Corps of Captain Commissaries and Drivers and disbanded in 1822. It was established to provide trained and disciplined drivers for the Royal Artillery, a service that had previously relied upon civilian contractors. Though closely associated with the Royal Regiment of Artillery the corps was listed separately from it in the London Gazette until at least 1815. By 1814 the corps numbered more than 7,400 men and fielded more than 2,600 men at the 1815 Battle of Waterloo. The unit was reduced in size after the end of the Napoleonic Wars and disbanded in 1822 by the Duke of Wellington.

== Foundation and service ==
What later became the Corps of Royal Artillery Drivers was founded in 1793 by Charles Lennox, 3rd Duke of Richmond who, as Master-General of the Ordnance, had responsibility for the British Army's artillery, engineers and logistics. Prior to this time the artillery guns, ammunition and other supplies had been transported by civilian contractors. These contractors supplied the necessary men, wagons and horses, but there were sometimes problems when these men – some untrained – abandoned their task in battle.

The men of the new corps were uniformed army personnel trained in managing guns, wagons and horses. The use of the corps allowed for quicker movement of the artillery; and, as provision was made for the gunners to travel on the gun limbers and wagons, reduced time for the guns to be brought into action. As first constituted, the corps consisted of 45 officers, 1,330 other ranks and 2,380 horses. By 1810 the corps had 78 officers, 4,860 other ranks and 7,000 horses; sufficient for the needs of the entire British field artillery. By 1814 the corps had grown to 88 officers and 7,352 other ranks; at the 1815 Battle of Waterloo more than half of the 5,300 artillery men present were from the corps of drivers. The corps had its headquarters within the Royal Artillery Barracks, Woolwich.

== Disbandment ==
Following the conclusion of the Napoleonic Wars seven troops of the corps were disbanded, leaving it with five troops and 1,336 men – a measure that saved £14,570 per annum. The officers of the corps were retired and replaced by officers made available from the Horse Artillery, which had lost three troops. This provided a means for the Board of Ordnance to retain experienced gunnery officers. The officers made redundant from the Corps of Royal Artillery Drivers were granted retirement on full pay (half-pay was the usual allowance for retired officers) due to the unusual circumstances; this cost the board some £1,600 per year in pensions.

The corps was disbanded in 1822 by the Duke of Wellington, who was then Master-General of the Ordnance. The Royal Artillery thereafter took responsibility for its own transport, with the artillerymen in the field batteries functioning as drivers and gunners. Major-General Sir Alex Dixon stated in 1838 that the system provided for better economic and efficient use of men, with 5,000 artillerymen able to do the work previously carried out by the 7,000-strong Corps of Royal Artillery Drivers. Dixon stated that the corps had unnecessarily tied up several thousand men in logistics duty during the Peninsular War. The new system, which was to be maintained even in times of war, was said to be particularly suited to the British Army, which needed units to be made ready at short notice for foreign or colonial service.

== Structure and organisation ==
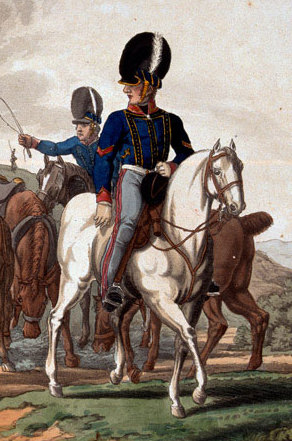
A depiction of the uniform of a sergeant of the corps in 1812

As initially constituted, the corps was formed of several independent companies, each under the command of a captain commissary, who was individually empowered to buy and sell the horses required for his company to operate. This, however, led to mismanagement, with officers deriving 'considerable emoluments from the situation, by the sale of the dung'. As a result, 'an Officer of Artillery was appointed to take command of the whole': Lt-Col. (later Lt-Gen.) Robert Douglas, who served as Commandant from 1795 through until 1817.

=== Name of the corps ===
The corps was governed by a series of warrants, being formally established by George III on 9 September 1794 as the "Corps of Captain Commissaries and Drivers attached to the parks of Artillery, serving in England". (A separate warrant of the same date approved the raising of a corps of commissary officers, non-commissioned officers and drivers to serve with the artillery 'now employed in the Low Countries'.) By a warrant of 1801 the corps was expanded and reconstituted as the "Corps of Gunner Drivers"; but another warrant of 1804 redesignated the establishment as the "Brigade of Gunners and Drivers, employed with the field trains, in our Royal Regiment of Artillery". By a further warrant of 1806, it was formally titled the "Corps of Royal Artillery Drivers, employed with the field trains in our Royal Regiment of Artillery". (The Field Train Department was responsible for the provision and distribution of guns, ammunition and stores to the Artillery on active service, and maintained 150 guns and 30 howitzers 'in a perfect state of readiness for any service' at its headquarters in the Grand Depôt, Woolwich; it therefore had to have a close working relationship with the corps, which provided, in a similar state of readiness, the horses and drivers to move them.) After 1817 the corps was listed as the "Corps of Artillery Drivers in the Royal Regiment of Artillery".

=== Ranks ===
The corps' officers had ranks similar to those of the rest of the British Army. Being closely associated with the artillery they followed their practice of using the ranks of first and second lieutenant. Until 1810 all officer ranks were suffixed with "commissary" (eg "first lieutenant-commissary" or "captain-commissary") but this was dropped the following year. The uniform was similar to that of the Horse Artillery, particularly with regards to the wearing of the light dragoon-style Tarleton helmet.

Officers of the Corps of Royal Artillery Drivers had no right of field command, all line officers outranked them and could issue commands to higher ranking corps officers on the battlefield. There was some controversy during the Napoleonic Wars as to whether officers in the corps should be allowed to freely transfer into the line infantry. It was commonplace, for example, for officers of the Royal Waggon Train to be promoted into line infantry regiments once they had accumulated sufficient years of service in their rank. A notable exception was a first lieutenant-commissary of the Corps of Royal Artillery Drivers who was granted special permission to become adjutant of the Ceylon Regiment in 1810.

Unusually, and 'contrary to every military principle', the privates of the Corps of Royal Artillery Drivers were not provided with any offensive or defensive weapon.

=== Establishment ===
The corps (as envisaged in its 1806 Warrant) was divided into ten Troops, each under the command of a captain, with 5 lieutenants and 450 drivers in each Troop; there was also a Riding House Troop (without drivers). Within a Troop, each lieutenant was responsible for one 'Brigade' of artillery (five guns and one howitzer), along with six ammunition carriages, a forge cart, spares and a camp equipage waggon; the number of horses and drivers used depended on the size of the guns.

By 1810 the corps comprised a colonel-commandant, three lieutenant-colonels, a major, nine captains, 54 subalterns, 2 adjutants, 8 veterinary surgeons, 45 staff sergeants, 405 other non-commissioned officers, 360 artificers, 45 trumpeters, 4,050 drivers and 7,000 horses. The sole major of the corps was in charge of the purchase of horses. Until 1817 the corps included on its strength all veterinary surgeons in the service of the Royal Artillery; after 1817 they were instead attached to the Veterinary Establishment in Woolwich.

=== Duties ===
In addition to their guns, the drivers and horses of the corps conveyed ammunition and stores for the Field Artillery units. They were furthermore responsible for conveying ammunition to the 'troops, volunteers &c.' of the Army more generally 'all over the kingdom'. As a cheaper alternative to using contract horses, horses belonging to the corps were often used by the Royal Engineers, as well as for station 'fatigue duties' such as conveying coal and forage. The establishment of the Corps of Royal Artillery Drivers included a riding house troop, for training riders in equestrianism.
