= Red Barracks, Woolwich =

Military installation for the Royal Marines

- Frances Street, Woolwich, London
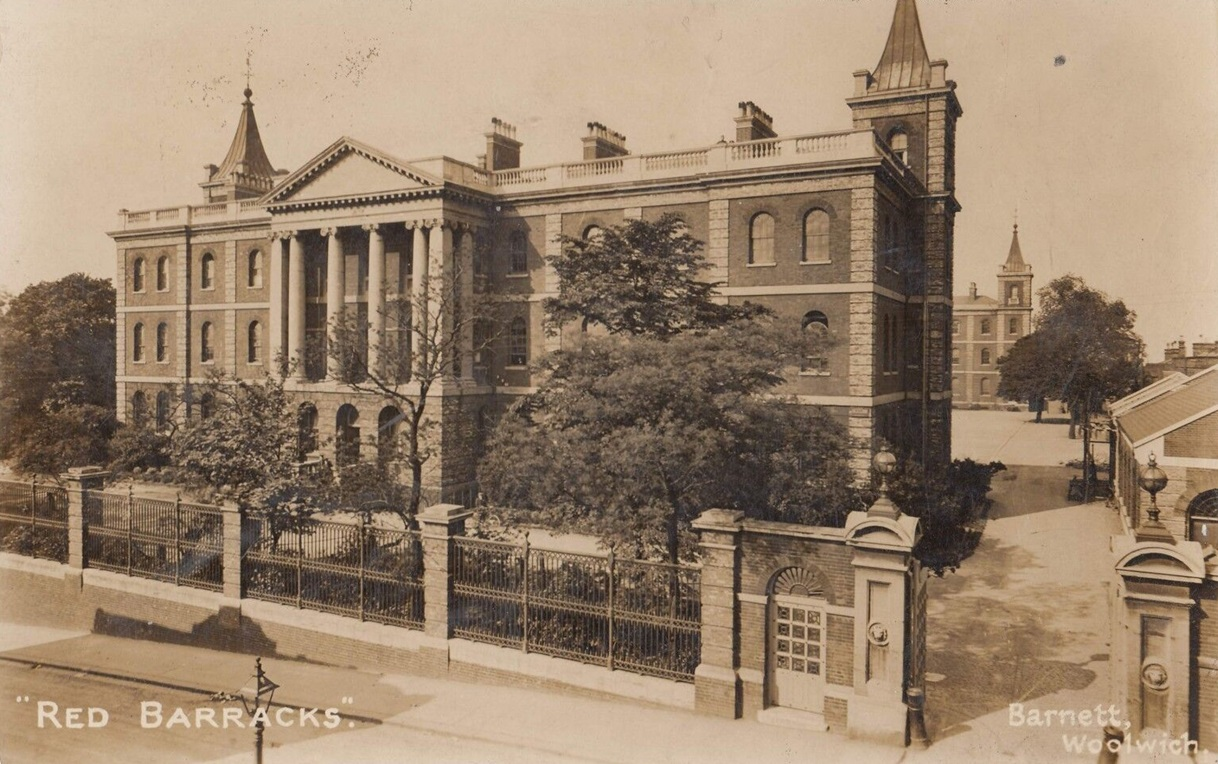
- The barracks

Site information
- Type: Military base

Location
- Location within London
- Coordinates: 51.4895°N 0.0542°E

Site history
- Built: 1858–1860
- Built for: Admiralty
- In use: 1860–1967

Garrison information
- Occupants: Royal Marine Infirmary; Royal Army Ordnance Corps; Military College of Science; Quality Assurance Directorate (Weapons)

The Red Barracks, formerly the Royal Marine Infirmary, was a military installation located in Frances Street, just south of Woolwich Dockyard, in London, England. It was commissioned as an infirmary for the Royal Marines and later became accommodation for the British Army.

== History ==
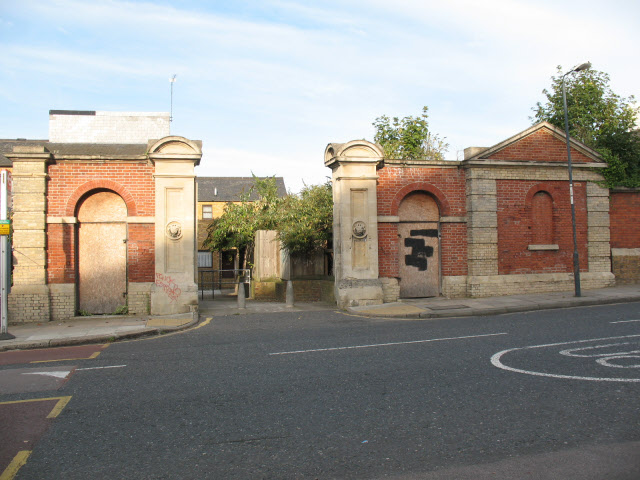
Entrance to the former Royal Marine Infirmary (later known as Red Barracks)

=== Royal Marine Infirmary ===
The building was commissioned as an infirmary to serve the Royal Marine Barracks, Woolwich. It was (along with Blackburn Infirmary) one of the first two pavilion-plan hospitals to be erected in England in the wake of the Crimean War. Construction started in 1858. It was designed by William Scamp in the neoclassical style, built in red brick with stone dressings and was completed in 1860.

The design of the three-storey building involved a symmetrical main frontage of 13 bays facing onto Frances Street. The central section of three bays, which was projected forward, featured three round headed openings on the ground floor and a tetrastyle portico spanning the first and second floors. The portico was formed by huge Ionic order columns supporting an entablature and a modillioned pediment. The wings of five bays each were fenestrated by round headed windows on all three floors. The wings were decorated by banded pilasters supporting a balustrade at roof level. The main barracks behind were laid out in a square with four-stage towers surmounted by spires at each corner. The infirmary, situated on a hill, was "the most conspicuous and striking feature of the town of Woolwich."

=== Red Barracks ===
After the closure of the Dockyard in 1869 the infirmary also passed to the British Army. Renamed Red Barracks, reflecting the original red brick design, the old infirmary building accommodated the Army Ordnance Corps (later the Royal Army Ordnance Corps) until October 1921, when the corps moved its headquarters to Hilsea Barracks near Portsmouth. From 1885 Red Barracks also accommodated Artillery College (known as Ordnance College from 1899 to 1918). After the departure of the RAOC the college expanded to fill the whole of Red Barracks; renamed the Military College of Science in 1927, the college moved to Shrivenham in 1939. Red Barracks then became the home of the Inspectorate of Armaments (later the Quality Assurance Directorate (Weapons)) and also accommodated the Royal Artillery Record Office from 1940.

The building was decommissioned by the British Army in 1967 and used as a venue for the comedy film, The National Health, which was released in 1973. Despite being a listed building, it was demolished in 1975. The perimeter walls, which date back to the 1850s, survive. The site was subsequently redeveloped for housing.

== Sources ==
- "The Survey of London: Volume 48: Woolwich" (PDF). English Heritage. 2012.
