= Immigration to Hampshire =

Hampshire has always been a popular destination for immigrants, with the ports at Portsmouth and Southampton receiving immigrants from all over Europe and being the starting point for voyages to the New World. Southampton Docks rapidly expanded since their creation in 1850, and saw increasing traffic with South Africa, Australia and the Americas.

== Poles In Portsmouth ==
In 1834 a group of Polish immigrants came through the Portsmouth docks. The Poles who arrived in Portsmouth had previously been staying in Prussia seeking refuge from war when they were ordered back to Poland, but many Polish soldiers refused, and a lot of them were consequently killed. Prussia then received them back, but as labourers on public works along with criminals. They were then offered the choice of return to Poland or passage to America; the Poles chose America. Three ships left Prussia, one, the Elizabeth, stopping at Le Havre, another, the Union, stopping at Harwich, and the third, the Marianne, docking at Portsmouth due to prolonged bad weather. When the winds abated the Poles passively resisted their Prussian Captain's insistence of transportation to America as they preferred to remain in Europe, closer to Poland.

They were then offered entry into French foreign legion to fight in Algiers, but were unwilling to join.

The people of Portsmouth and Portsea welcomed them immediately. Without encouragement from the authorities, the people of Portsmouth assisted and supported these exiles, army officers particularly treating the Polish refugees with kindness and propriety. One article states "Not the rich and great alone have contributed, but perhaps many a hard- earned shilling has been dropped into the subscription boxes by the artisan or labourer". Many in the town subscribed to support the Poles financially as well, including the body of liberal politicians in Portsmouth. Efforts were at once made to collect funds for the support of the poor foreigners.

Schools in Portsmouth made collections and held charity events to raise money for them. The non-commissioned officers of the 12th regiment contributed £7 and the 77th Depot gave £12, while a concert at the Green Row Rooms brought in £60. "The civil and moral character of the country was sustained by the reaction to the Poles’ arrival from the locals."

A memorial was built, but only half completed before funds ran out and it remained unfinished until 2004. The Polish Memorial Fund succeeded in raising funds to complete the New Memorial, and produced a pamphlet to commemorate the occasion.

== Poles in Southampton ==
After the outbreak of the Springtime of the Nations in 1848 Poles actively supported many European revolutions of that time. A Polish Legion numbering some 2,000 soldiers served under Lajos Kossuth in the Hungarian insurrection. After its defeat Poles and Hungarians fled from Hungary, crossed the border into Turkey and became detained on its territory. The main place of their imprisonment was the citadel of Kutayah in central Turkey where a few hundred Poles and Hungarians, with their leader, Kossuth, were kept for over three years. Thanks to the diplomatic efforts of Viscount Palmerston these soldiers became finally released in 1851 and came to England on board many different ships (Sultan, Mississippi, Euxine). Different groups of refugees have arrived in ports of England between February and October of that year.

By 6 May only about 40 Hungarians remained in Turkey. According to the statistics of the Literary Association of the Friends of Poland 464 Poles arrived in Great Britain in 1851 and over 200 left the country. At that time the general number of Polish refugees numbered about 800 people. The refugees from Turkey came to different English ports: Liverpool, Leeds and Southampton. Many of them decided to emigrate to US.

The Southampton City Council had to spend 1232 – 9 – 6 on those refugees. They were also supported by the Literary Association of the Friends of Poland, which offered a donation of 8 – 5 – 0. There are also records stating that the group of 30 Poles who decided to stay in Southampton received an additional payment of 216 – 14 – 6 in August of that year.

General Bulcharyn and his fellow soldiers arrived in Southampton to find themselves in very miserable conditions. They went to London and sent a special letter to Sir George Grey, Her Majesty's Principal Secretary in which they presented their situation and "humbly begged to extend to them that protection which was granted to many of their fellow countrymen". In support of his petition, Bulcharyn provided the list of the soldiers and their servants, asking for a grant of £10 for each of them.

Most of the refugees who decided to stay in England could expect support only from private sources, as the Government was unwilling to extend its grants on the newcomers. As one of the British politicians stated in his letter to Prince Czartoryski "There is scarcely any sympathy remained for Poles." Although it was the view of political elites, it was shared by the common people. The final stage of these events was the departure of over 100 soldiers from Portsmouth after the outbreak of the Crimean War. These soldiers returned to Turkey to fight against Russia in the army of their former jailer. Many others left to America and the population of the Polish refugees in the 1850s steadily decreased.

== Russian Jews in Southampton ==
There was an increasing hostility towards the Jews since the partitions of Poland that led to outbreaks of pogroms across Russia. The first began in 1881 and spread throughout Southern Russia, lasting four years during which thousands of Jews were injured and their property burnt or destroyed. Further waves of pogroms occurred in 1903 and 1905. Faced with the terrors of the violent pogroms, many Jews opted to leave Russia. It is estimated around 2 million Jews left Russia during this period.

One famous Jewish family, the Rothschilds, did a lot of work to improve the Jewish situation in Russia, being very influential in areas such as education. They also helped those who were leaving Russia to escape the pogroms, by founding the ‘Emigrants Home’ Lodging House. The house was founded in 1894 along with John Doling, in Albert road, within easy reach of Southampton docks. The house was built on four floors and included a large kitchen, pantry, washrooms, drying and ironing rooms in the basement and then three floors containing sleeping quarters. The house officially opened in 1895.

Over 500,000 immigrants stayed in the UK for up to six months before moving onto America, with 4,000 leaving the docks every month to go to the new world. Whilst most only stayed in Southampton as a stopgap, 150,000 immigrants remained and settled throughout the UK, and many of them must have remained in Southampton.

Whilst the ‘Emigrants House’ was created mainly to cater for the Jews escaping the pogroms, they weren't the only community that left Russia at that time. Since the Polish Uprising in 1863, Russia had been distrustful of the different communities, and the pogroms were often used to cloak attacks on poles as well. Therefore, Poles may also have used the home. The ‘Emigrants Home’ became the Atlantic Hotel in 1908, and continued to house immigrants that came in from the docks.

== Immigrant areas in Southampton ==
At the beginning of the 20th century a new wave of immigrants settled in Southampton in what was known as the ditches. The ditches was an area of Southampton, along Canal Street, East Street and Main Street. Its relative proximity to the docks made it an ideal spot for immigrants arriving by sea and it quickly became a cosmopolitan area, known for it multicultural society.

Maie Hodgson was a child growing up in the ditches at the beginning of the 1900s. Her memoirs describe the ditches as having "a sort of fair-ground element" as a result of the immigrants that lived along the streets, remembering a fortune teller, Madame Conrad, who was from Ceylon. There were also Italian and Jewish communities in this area. She recalls one Italian immigrant family running an ice-cream shop and tea rooms called Donnarumma’s. The family spoke little English and had seven children.

Whilst the residents may have enjoyed its fair-ground atmosphere, others from Southampton considered it an area to be wary of, filled with bargain shops and rife with crime. At night the area was a prime place for prostitutes. Lewishon describes it as ‘a subculture straight out of a Dickens novel, the kind of street mothers forbade their children to visit.’ Whilst it is likely to be an over exaggeration such rumours gave the residents of Southampton a bad impression of the immigrant community.

== Immigrants in Atlantic Park ==
Atlantic Park was opened in the spring of 1922 on the site now known as Southampton Airport in Eastleigh. The park was formed as a way of bringing transmigrants together in one place in order to provide them with better conditions than those previously experienced in a number of boarding houses and to protect them from unscrupulous people who would attempt to prey on those arriving in a new country.

The park was formed as a joint venture between companies such as Cunard, White Star and Canadian Pacific Railways. It became a virtually self-contained township boasting its own school, medical centre, synagogue and even a library containing books in languages such as English, Polish, Russian, German and Yiddish.

Although the aim of the park was to provide short term accommodation to transmigrants passing through Southampton changes in the US policies on quota restrictions meant that some immigrants were trapped at the park for longer periods, unable to carry on with their journey or return home to their country of origin due to the fear of persecution. Some of those affected remained in Southampton for the best part of half a decade.

One family who experienced the problems of quota restrictions were the Shlemowitz family. The four orphaned sisters and their brother arrived in Southampton from Ukraine. Following the revolution their father was forced into road building and beaten mercilessly until his death. The children witnessed their mother's rape and mutilation prior to her death from pneumonia. At this time it was decided that they should be sent to America to live with their uncle Jacob in New York. On arriving in England the children were sent to Atlantic Park where, as Liza, then aged 13 explained, their heads were shaved and they were sprayed with disinfecting water. Eventually, in December 1923 the children set off for America on board the Aquitania but were detained on Ellis Island for a period of 10 days before being deported back to England. The children returned to Atlantic Park where they remained for a period of about 10 months before their uncle Jacob arrived to collect them. Together they headed to South Africa where they would eventually settle.

For many, although far from luxurious, the experiences of Atlantic Park were not especially traumatic. Although in principle they were confined to the hostel, many freely interacted with the local community. The numbers of immigrants held at Atlantic Park slowly diminished from 1928 until its eventual closure in 1931.

== The Basque Children's Camp at Stoneham ==
During the Spanish Civil War the town of Guernica, in April 1937, was bombed by the Nazi Condor Legion and was subsequently destroyed. Due to the terror caused by the enemy air raids as well as concerns over the number of children who had been involved in the fighting, the decision was made to send children from the area to England in order to protect them from the reality of war.

The children left for Britain on the steamship the Habana on 21 May 1937, escorted by Royal Oak and HMS Forester. The ship carried not just 3,820 children but also 80 teachers, 120 helpers, 15 Catholic priests and 2 doctors. When they arrived in Southampton they were sent in busloads to the camp in North Stoneham in Eastleigh.

The camp was set on a 30-acre (120,000 m^{2}) field which had been donated to the relief co-ordinators by a local farmer Mr. G.H. Brown. The camp was made up of 500 bell tents and a hundred or more marquees and also boasted its own cinema and hospital. The generosity of the farmer who donated the land reflects the willingness of the local people as a whole to help the children.

Volunteers from Eastleigh, Southampton and surrounding areas poured into North Stoneham camp and were largely responsible for its coming to life. Children were provided with food, new clothes, shoes and toys and many visitors to the camp with good intentions passed over sweets and chocolate and exchanged their money for Spanish notes and coins. The camp was believed to have cost £1500 a week during its height. Consideration was also given in that pilots were told not to fly over the camp because of the danger of panic among the children who had come to dread the sound of aeroplanes and ships in the harbour were told not to sound sirens as their noise was said to have resembled the air raid warnings.

The camp was not intended however to be a permanent home for the children and they were to be removed from North Stoneham and placed in various hostels throughout the country. Soon after arrival four hundred of the children were quickly moved on to Lower Clapton by luxury coaches to be cared for by the Salvation Army at Congress Hall (now part of the Clapton Girls' Academy). By June parties were leaving almost daily for homes and hostels arranged for them during their stay in England. By July, 2360 had already been drafted or were about to be drafted to homes in various parts of the country. It was in September that the camp was finally closed.
