= Royal Artillery Museum =

Military museum in London, England

The Royal Artillery Museum
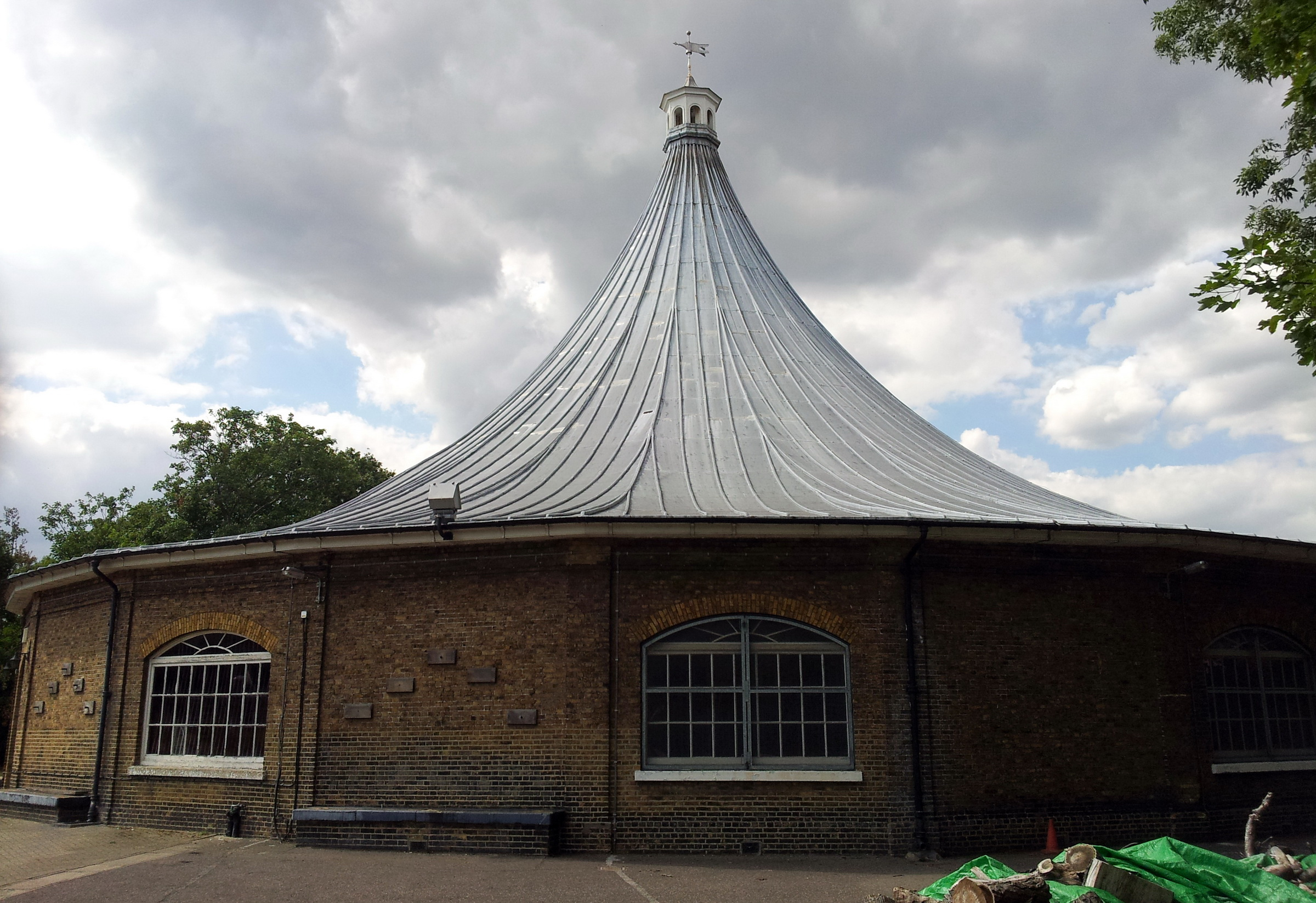
- The Rotunda, Woolwich: home of the museum from 1820 to 2001
- Established: 4 May 1820
- Dissolved: 8 July 2016

The Royal Artillery Museum, which was one of the world's oldest military museums, was first opened to the public in Woolwich in southeast London on 4 May 1820. The regimental museum of the Royal Artillery, it told the story of the development of artillery by way of a collection of artillery pieces from across the centuries.

The museum had its roots in an earlier institution, the Royal Military Repository (established in Woolwich in the 1770s as a training collection for cadets of the Royal Military Academy); items which were once displayed in the Repository form the nucleus of the Royal Artillery Museum collection.

Following the closure in 2016 of the museum, branded since 2001 as 'Firepower – The Royal Artillery Museum', its collection has been placed in storage pending the establishment of a new Royal Artillery Museum. The collections are designated as being of national and international significance by Arts Council England.

== History ==
The museum has its origins in 18th-century Woolwich, in the Royal Arsenal (which at the time was known as the Warren). Two permanent companies of field artillery had been established here by the Board of Ordnance in 1716, each 100 men strong; this became the "Royal Artillery" in 1720. Also in the Warren, in 1741, the Board had established a Royal Military Academy to train its artillery and engineer cadets.

=== The Royal Military Repository ===
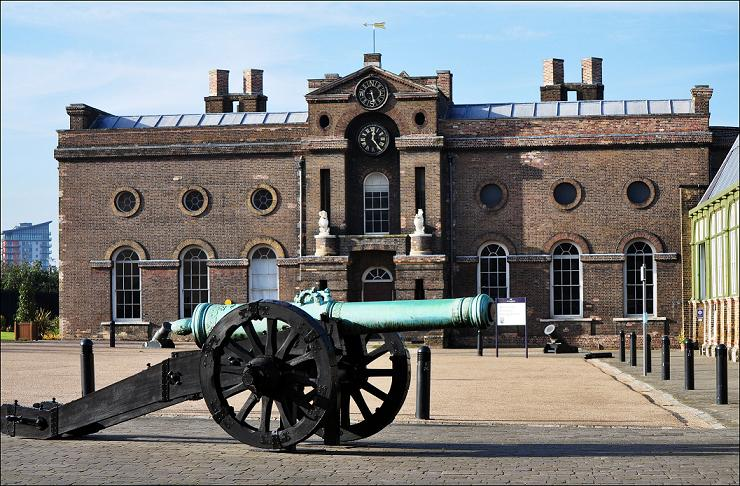
The former Royal Military Academy building in the Royal Arsenal housed the museum's collection from 1802 to 1820

In 1778 Captain William Congreve (1742–1814) of the Royal Artillery set up a training establishment within the Warren, as an offshoot of the Royal Military Academy, to instruct officers in handling heavy equipment in the field of battle. Congreve's experiences as a lieutenant firework in Canada during the Seven Years' War had convinced him of the need to train the artillery to manoeuvre heavy ordnance in difficult conditions. His 'Repository of Military Machines' (soon given the title of Royal Military Repository) was housed in a long two-storey building alongside the Carriage Works: cannons used for field training were stored on the ground floor while smaller items and models used for teaching purposes were displayed upstairs. Training initially took place on land to the east of the Warren and later moved to the woods to the west of Woolwich Common, close to the new Artillery Barracks, which are known still as 'Repository Grounds' or Repository Woods.

The Repository building itself was seriously damaged by fire (probably arson) in 1802. Those items that were saved or salvaged soon found a new home in the old premises of the Royal Military Academy, which itself moved from the Arsenal to Woolwich Common in 1806.

=== The Museum of Artillery in the Rotunda ===
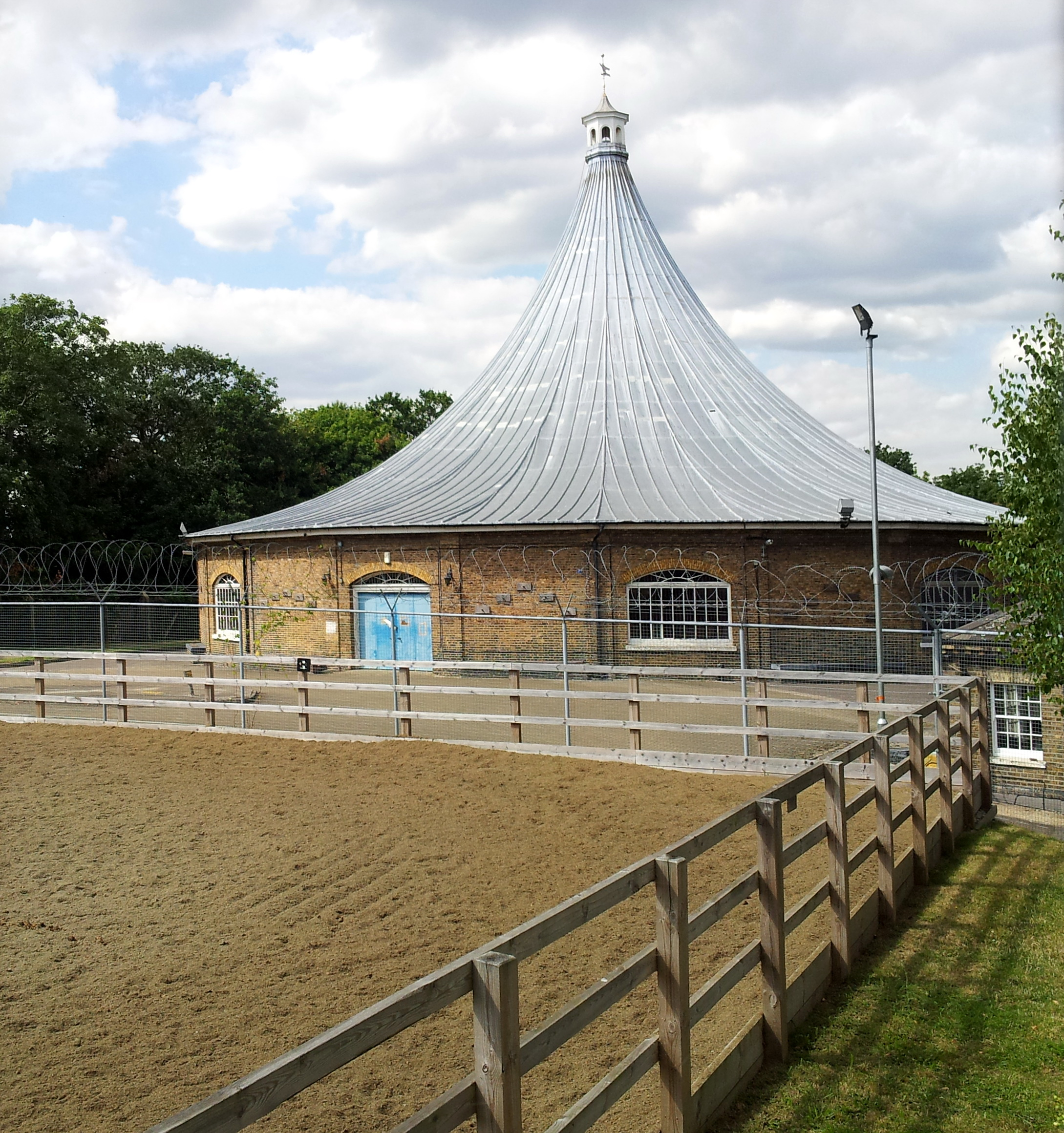
John Nash's Rotunda, originally built at Carlton House in 1814, was rebuilt on Woolwich Common in 1819 to house the Royal Artillery Museum collections

After the death of the Repository's founder in 1814, his son William Congreve (1772–1828) succeeded to all his father's appointments, including Commandant of the Royal Military Repository and Superintendent of Military Machines. The younger Congreve secured a new home for the Repository collection in a building of unusual provenance. The Rotunda had initially been erected in London in 1814 as an elaborate temporary marquee in the grounds of Carlton House. It was built for a ball given by the Prince Regent in honour of the Duke of Wellington in anticipation of victory over Napoleon Bonaparte; designed by John Nash, it was made to resemble a military bell tent.

After the victory celebrations were over the building languished without a use; but in 1818 the Prince Regent authorised the Rotunda's removal to Woolwich "to be appropriated to the conservation of the trophies obtained in the last war, the artillery models, and other military curiosities usually preserved in the Repository". On 7 December 1818, Congreve requested the building be erected "on the brow of the Hill at the eastern boundary of the Repository Grounds, that spot being the most convenient as well as the most picturesque situation for it." It was rebuilt on the eastern edge of the Repository Grounds during 1819.

The museum opened to the public on 4 May 1820, becoming an early and free permanent public museum in its new accessible location. Inside, trophies and weapons were arranged around the central column with display cases all around containing models and smaller exhibits; larger artillery pieces were displayed outside. Congreve added his own model of St James's Park and Carlton House Gardens during the 1814 celebrations (showing the Rotunda in its original position) to the museum's collection, though this model is now seemingly lost. He also contributed his celebrated rockets and other inventions. In 1988 responsibility for the collection was vested in the Royal Artillery Historical Trust (which had been established in 1981 'as a mechanism for the Regiment to consolidate legal ownership of elements of the Regimental heritage').

The museum continued in the Rotunda through to the very end of the 20th century, despite attempts at various times (including in 1932, 1953, in the 1960s and 1980s) to move it elsewhere. Eventually accommodation was secured for a new museum within the old Royal Arsenal (the Army having left the site in the 1990s). The Royal Artillery Museum in the Rotunda closed in 1999 (though the Rotunda continued to house the museum's reserve collection until 2010).

=== Royal Artillery Regimental Museum ===
Independent of the museum in the Rotunda, the Royal Artillery Institution (founded in 1838) had established its own museum collection related to the history of the regiment, including uniforms, medals and other items. The Institution's headquarters (within the Royal Artillery Barracks) was severely damaged in the Blitz, but everything that could be salvaged from its museum, library and archives was moved in 1941 to the central block of the recently vacated Royal Military Academy building on the common (the academy having transferred in 1939 to Sandhurst). The Institution and its museum remained there until 1999, whereupon its collections were combined with those of the Rotunda to form the new Firepower museum. (The library and archives of the Institution were moved at the same time to an adjacent building in the Arsenal, the James Clavell Library).

=== Firepower: The Royal Artillery Museum ===
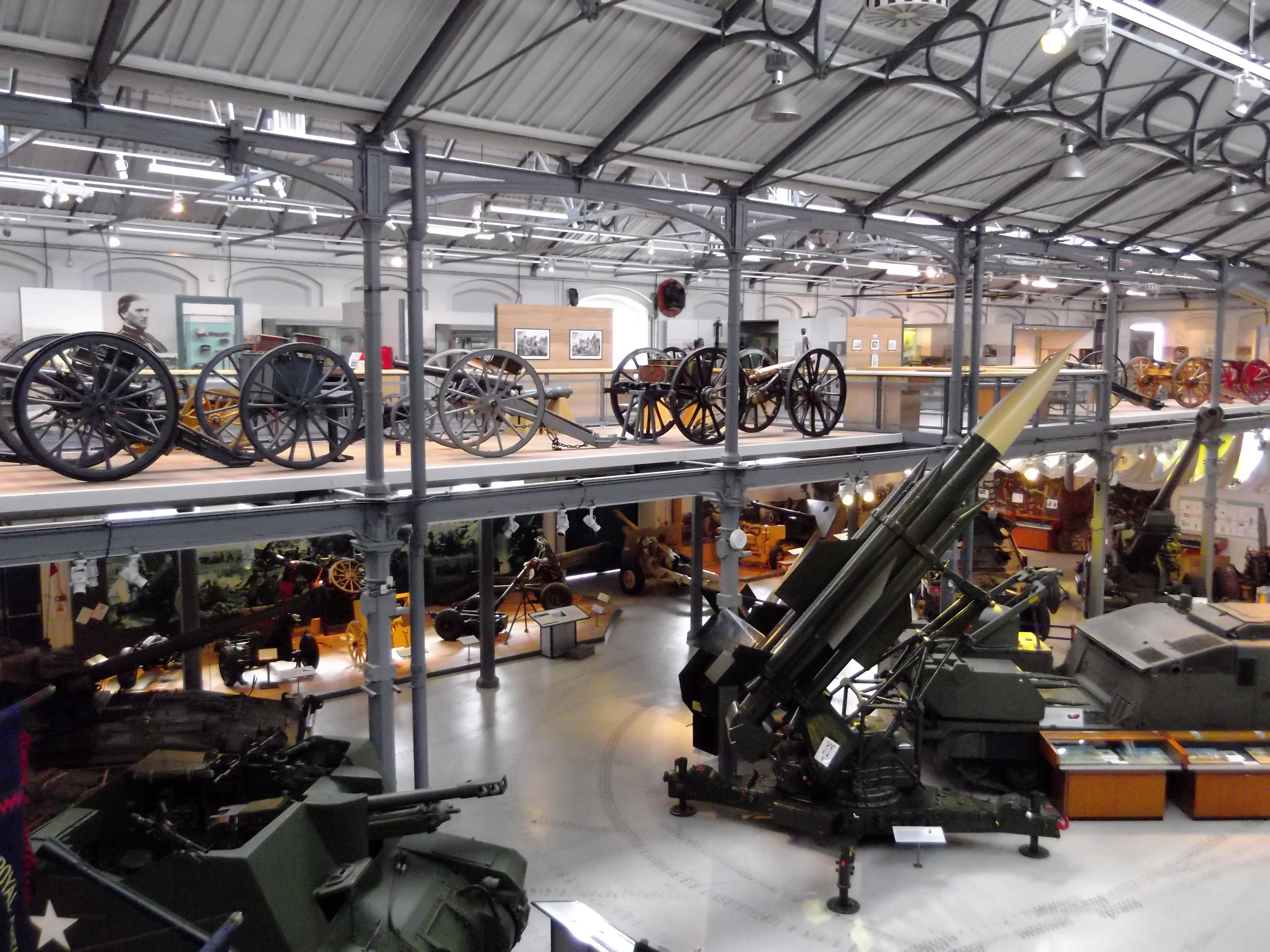
Part of the museum collection as presented in Firepower's Gunnery Hall, with 20th-century pieces on the ground floor and older items above

Between 2001 and 2016 the combined museum was branded as Firepower: The Royal Artillery Museum and was housed in some of the former buildings of the Royal Arsenal. All Firepower's buildings were once part of the Royal Laboratory Department, which controlled the manufacture of ammunition; they are for the most part Grade II listed, with structural ironwork by Benjamin Hick & Son of Bolton. The adjacent Greenwich Heritage Centre told the story of the local people of Greenwich who worked in the Arsenal and made the guns.

==== Closure ====
Firepower closed in July 2016 and its buildings were acquired by Greenwich Council, which had hopes of establishing a "significant new cultural and heritage quarter" on the site. The relocation of the museum was described by a board member as a "missed opportunity". Later that year, Greenwich Heritage Centre filled part of the gap by creating a new exhibition Making Woolwich: The Royal Regiment of Artillery in Woolwich. The project was supported amongst others by the Royal Regiment of Artillery, Royal Artillery Museums Ltd, Friends of the Royal Artillery Collections and the Royal Artillery Historical Trust.

==== Future of the buildings ====
In 2017 it was announced that the Royal Borough of Greenwich had acquired five historic buildings around No 1 Street to create a £31 million cultural district including buildings 17, 18 and 41, which were all used by Firepower. The plan included a 450-seat black box theatre to be built on the site of the former museum entrance. Building 17 (and other listed buildings nearby) would house rehearsal studios for resident companies such as Academy Performing Arts, Dash Arts, Chickenshed Theatre, Protein Dance, Greenwich Dance and Greenwich+Docklands International Festival. The Greenwich Heritage Centre was intended to move to the former James Clavell Library, until 2016 part of Firepower, but closed in July 2018.

==== Gallery of buildings ====
The following buildings were leased to Firepower by Greenwich London Borough Council:

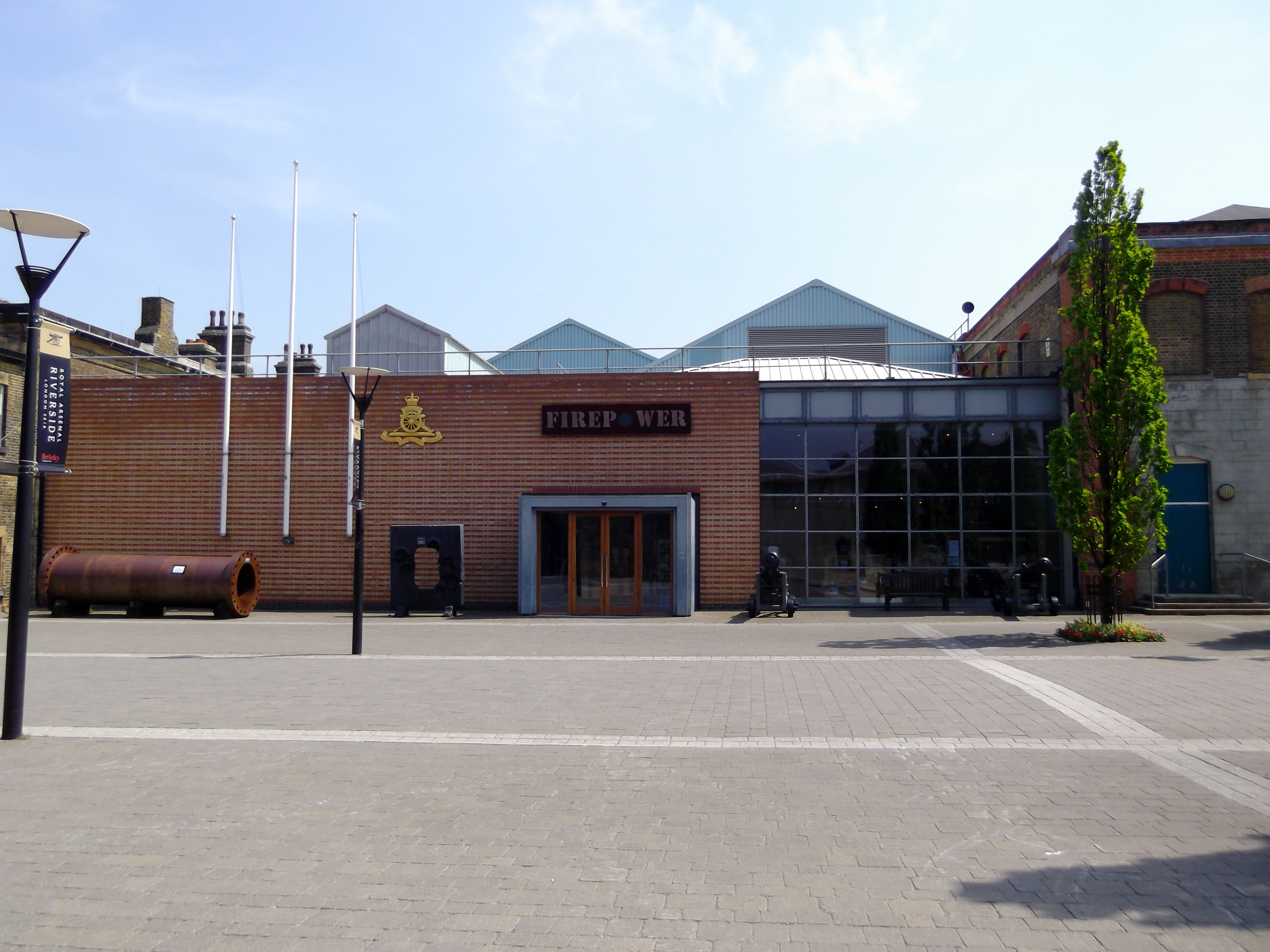
The main museum entrance opened into a new building, which housed the Modern Gunner galleries.

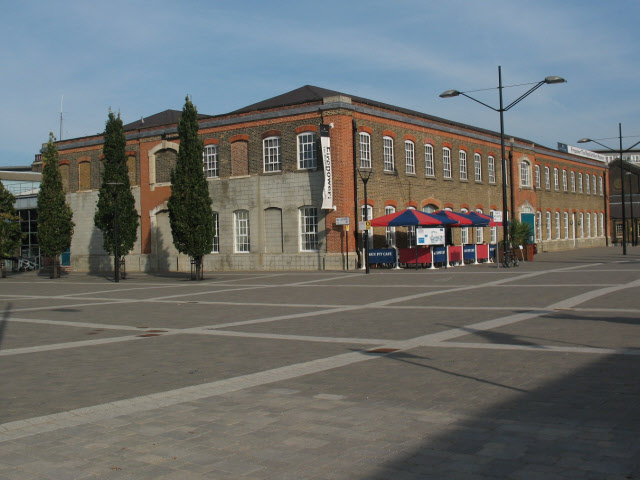
To the right of the main entrance, the former Paper Cartridge Factory (Building 17, 1855–56) housed the main Gunnery Hall as well as the History Gallery and other exhibitions.

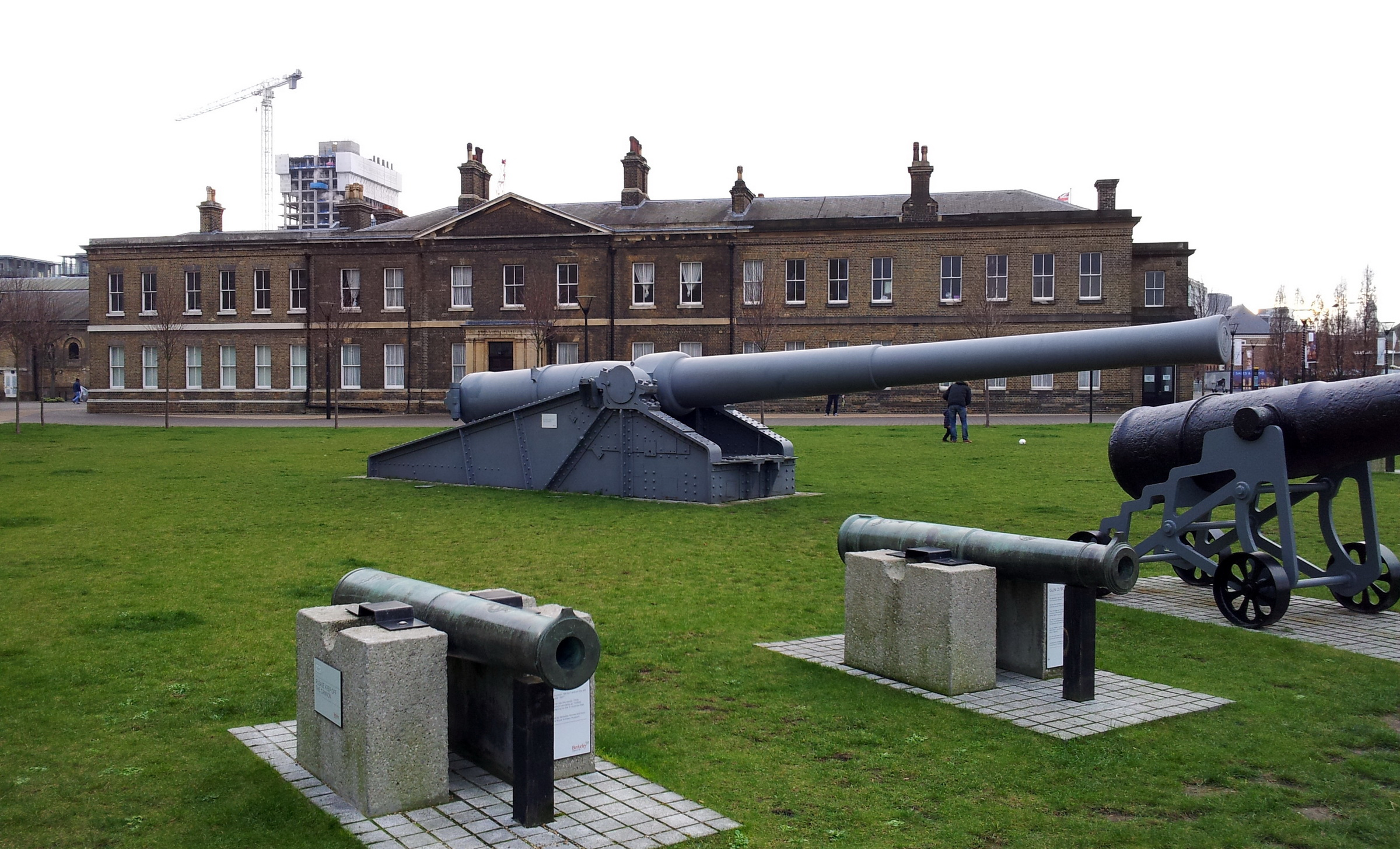
To the left of the main entrance, the former Royal Laboratory Offices (Building 18, 1855–56) housed museum offices and archives (James Clavell Library).

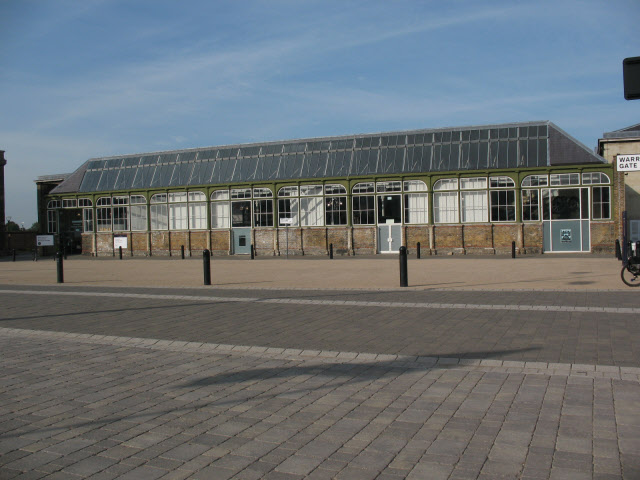
Building 41 (opposite the main museum) was originally part of the New Laboratory Square factory complex; it housed large Cold War-era exhibits.

==== Gallery of exhibits ====
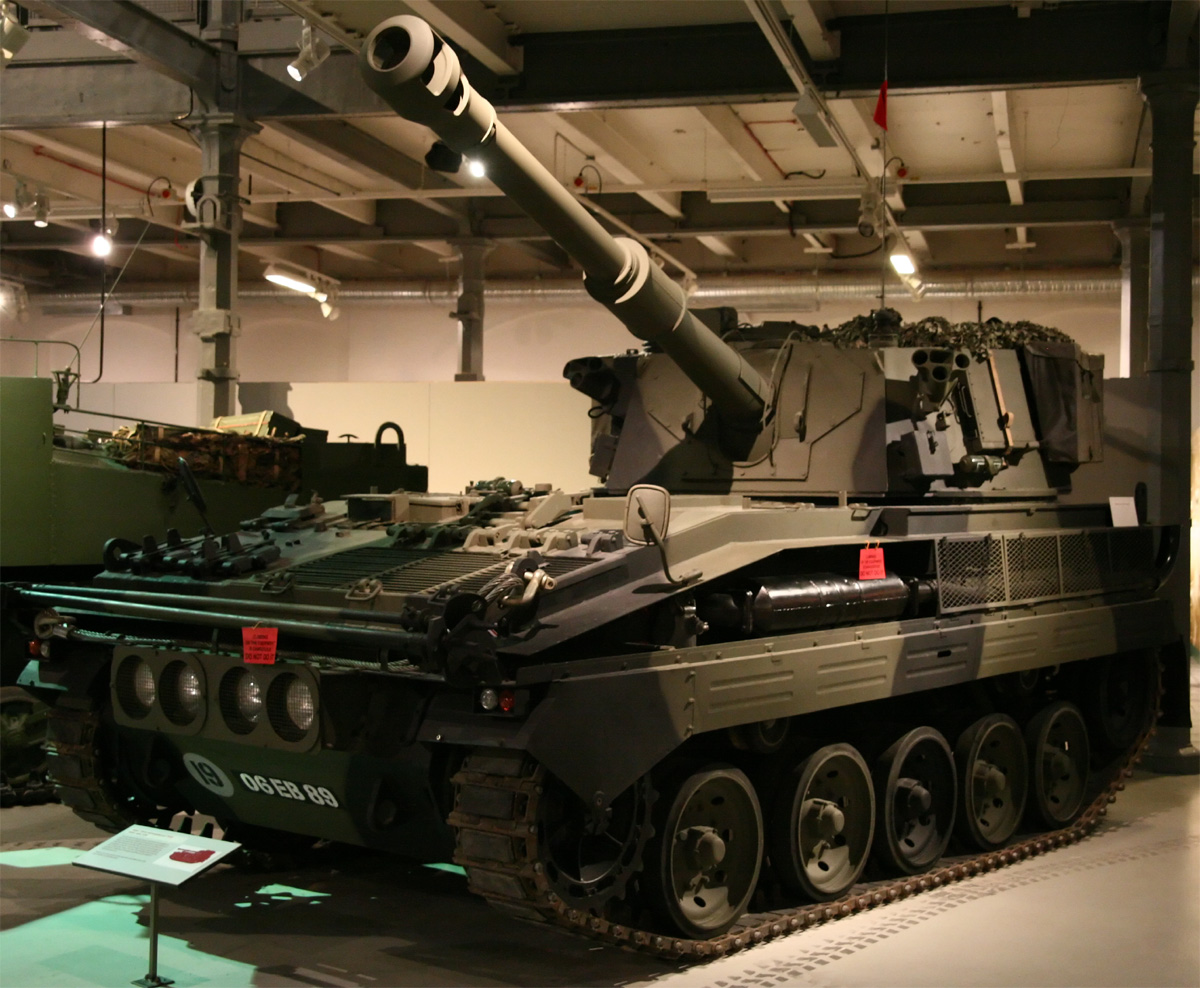
A FV433 Abbot SPG

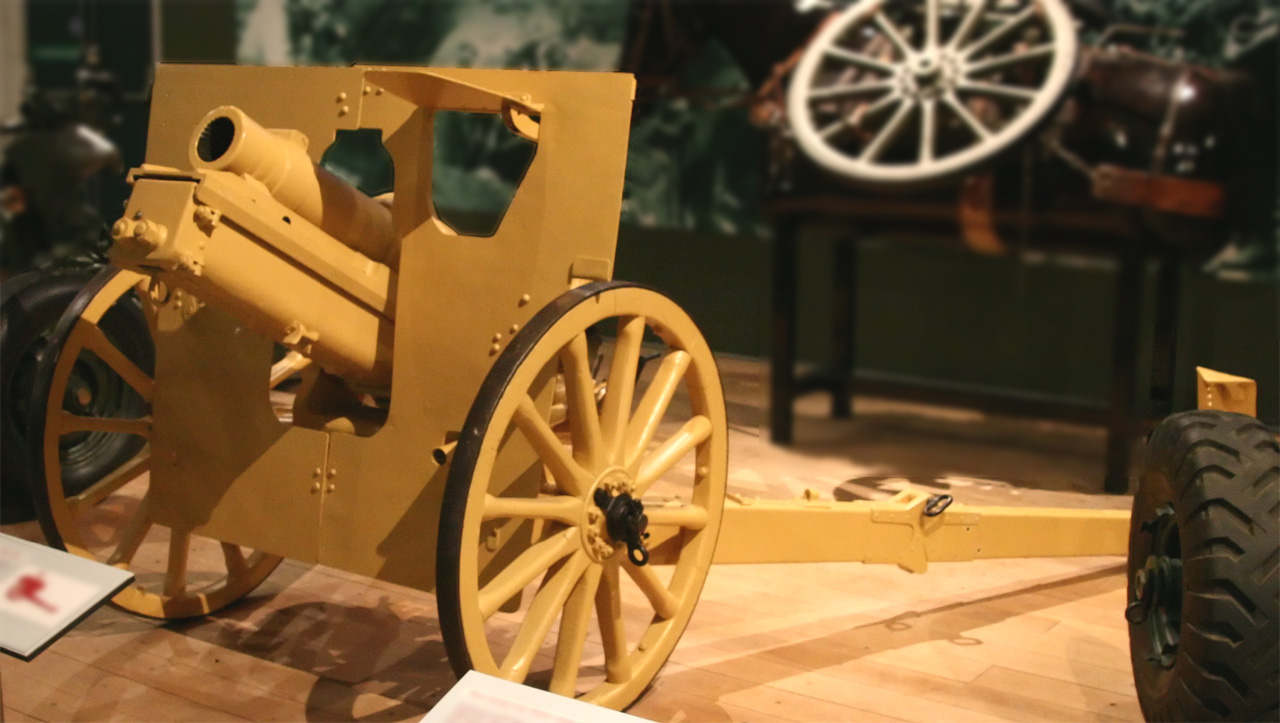
A 3.7-inch mountain howitzer

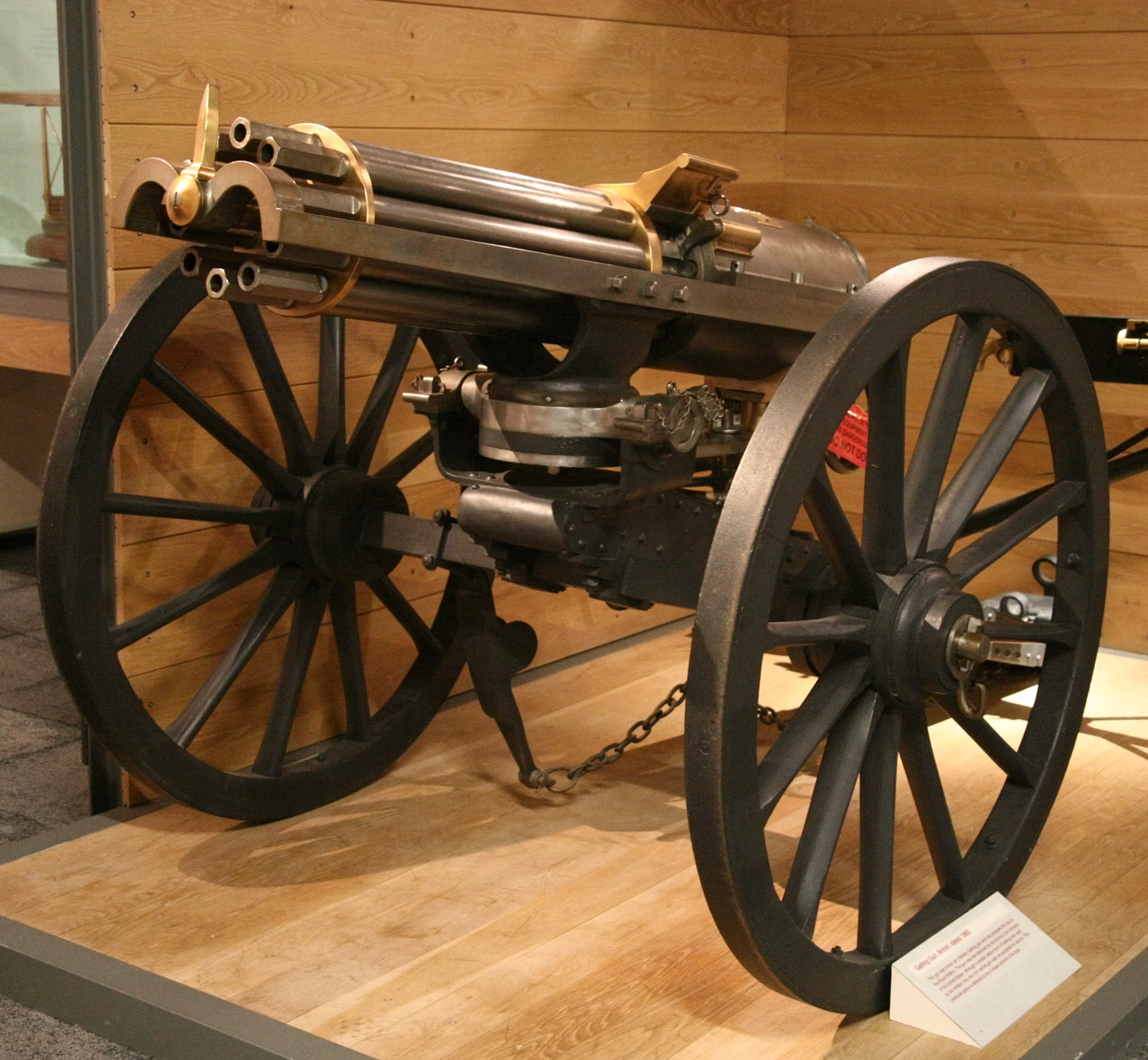
A Gatling gun

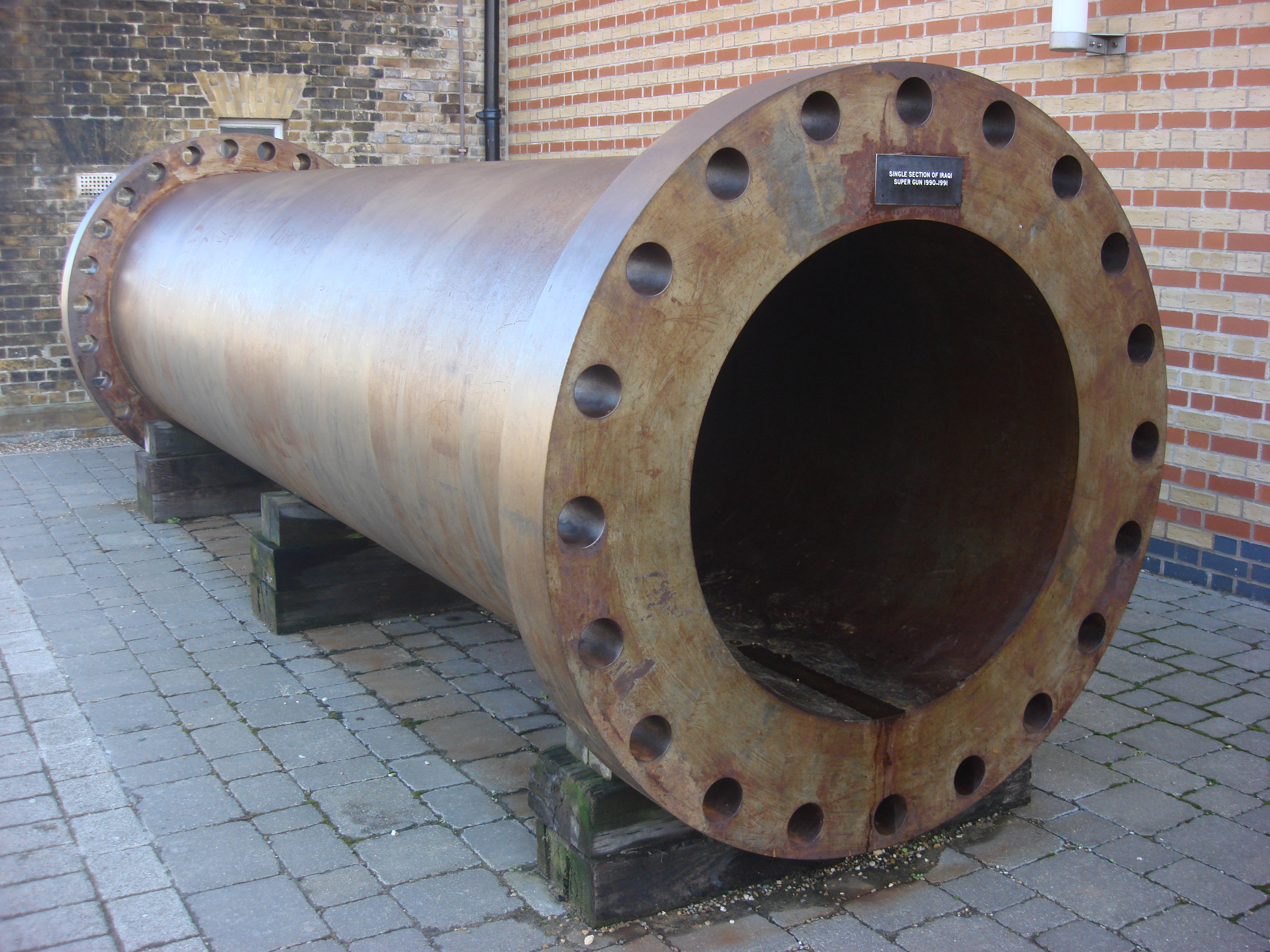
A section of the 1990–1991 Iraqi supergun

== Plans ==
In 2020, it was reported that the Royal Artillery Museum collection would be displayed in a new museum on Salisbury Plain, at Avon Camp West, south of Netheravon. Later that year, the Army withdrew its support for the lease of the proposed site, leading to a "strategic re-appraisal" of the project. In the meantime, the exhibits are being stored and conserved in museum stores nearby with limited public access.

In 2026, the Royal Artillery Museum received initial support from the National Lottery Heritage Fund for its project to create a museum at Larkhill, the regiment's headquarters on Salisbury Plain. Development funding of £286,999 was awarded to help the Royal Artillery Museum progress their plans to apply for a full grant of £4.6 million at a later date.

== Sources ==
- Congreve, William (1822). Detail of the Different Models, Arms, Trophies and Military Machines of every description contained in the Rotunda and the Grounds of the Royal Military Repository at Woolwich. London.
- Emily Cole; Susan Skedd; Jonathan Clarke; Sarah Newsome (2020). The Rotunda (former Royal Artillery Museum), Woolwich Common, London Borough of Greenwich: History, Structure and Landscape (PDF) (Report). Historic England. 251-2020.
