= Glamping =

Amenity-laden "glamorous camping"

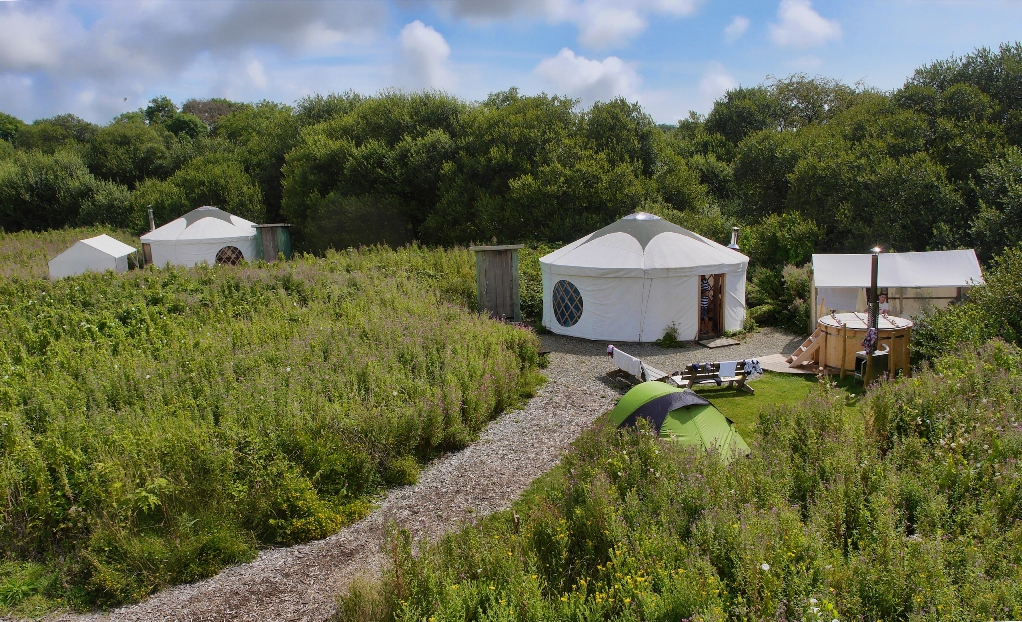
A glamping "village" with semi-permanent yurts, gravel paths, and a hot tub

Glamping (a blend of "glamorous" + "camping") is a style of camping with amenities and, in some cases, resort-style services not usually associated with "traditional" camping.

Glamping has become particularly popular with 21st-century tourists seeking modern amenities, such as Wi-Fi, alongside "the escapism and adventure recreation of camping", in a variety of accommodations such as cabins, treehouses, and tents.

== History ==
The word "glamping" first appeared in the United Kingdom in 2005 and was added to the Oxford English Dictionary in 2016. The word is new, but the concept that "glamping" connotes, that of luxurious tent-living (or living in other camping accommodations), is not. In the 16th century, the Scottish Earl of Atholl prepared a lavish experience in the Highlands for the visiting King James V and his mother. Here, the Duke pitched lavish tents and filled them with all the provisions of his own home palace.

Probably the most extravagant example of palatial tent-living in history was the Field of the Cloth of Gold, a diplomatic summit in 1520 between Francis I of France and Henry VIII of England in northern France. Some 2,800 tents and marquees were erected, and fountains ran with red wine.

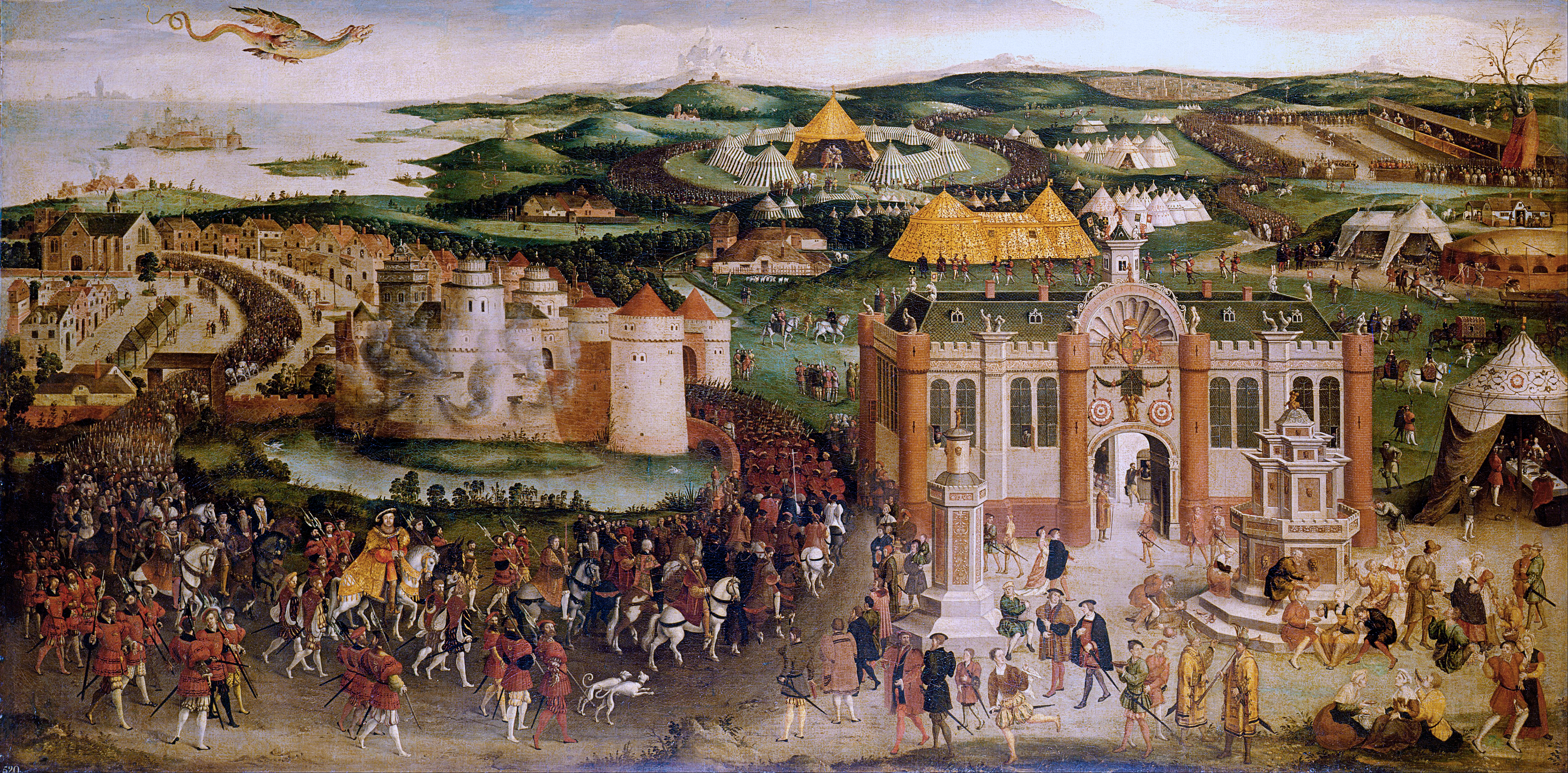
Henry VIII at left arrives at the Field of the Cloth of Gold in northern France. The building at right was made of wood and painted canvas – two wine fountains are pictured in front of it. Royal Collection, Hampton Court Palace.

Around the same time, the Ottomans had ostentatious, palatial tents transported from one military mission to the next. Entire teams of artisans travelled with the army to erect and maintain these imperial tents. As described by Professor Nurhan Atasoy,

The exquisite ornamentation both inside and out of the tents used by the Ottoman sultans made them imposing dwellings fit for a ruler. On ceremonial occasions tents served to create a splendid theatrical setting, as we see vividly portrayed in miniature paintings depicting banquets, audiences and celebrations which took place in the imperial tent complex over the centuries. The imperial tents were richly decorated as if they were pavilions, and often had designs resembling tiled panels, usually in floral patterns, either in appliés work using cloth of different colours, or embroidered in various stitches using silk and metal thread.

== Recent trends ==
Some 80 years later, in the 1920s, an African safari became "the thing to do" among wealthy Americans and British. But wealthy travelers, even those in search of adventure, were not willing to sacrifice comfort or luxury. From electric generators, to folding baths, and cases of champagne, travelers were afforded every domestic luxury while on adventure.

Others have suggested that recent interest in glamping can be traced back to the 1990s, as safari camps became increasingly popular in Africa and coastal Thailand. In 2011, CNN reported that glamping had also become popular in the United States, Europe, and Australia. The modern version of glamping offers holidaymakers "spacious designer-outfitted tents complete with soft sheets instead of sweaty sleeping bags". By minimizing the impact on the environment of constantly unpacking tents and poorly discarding waste, glamping is also arguably environmentally friendly.

Since 2020, the tourism industry has seen renewed interest in glamping, due to the global outbreak of the COVID-19 pandemic, because it allows for social distancing and provides opportunities for outdoor recreation.

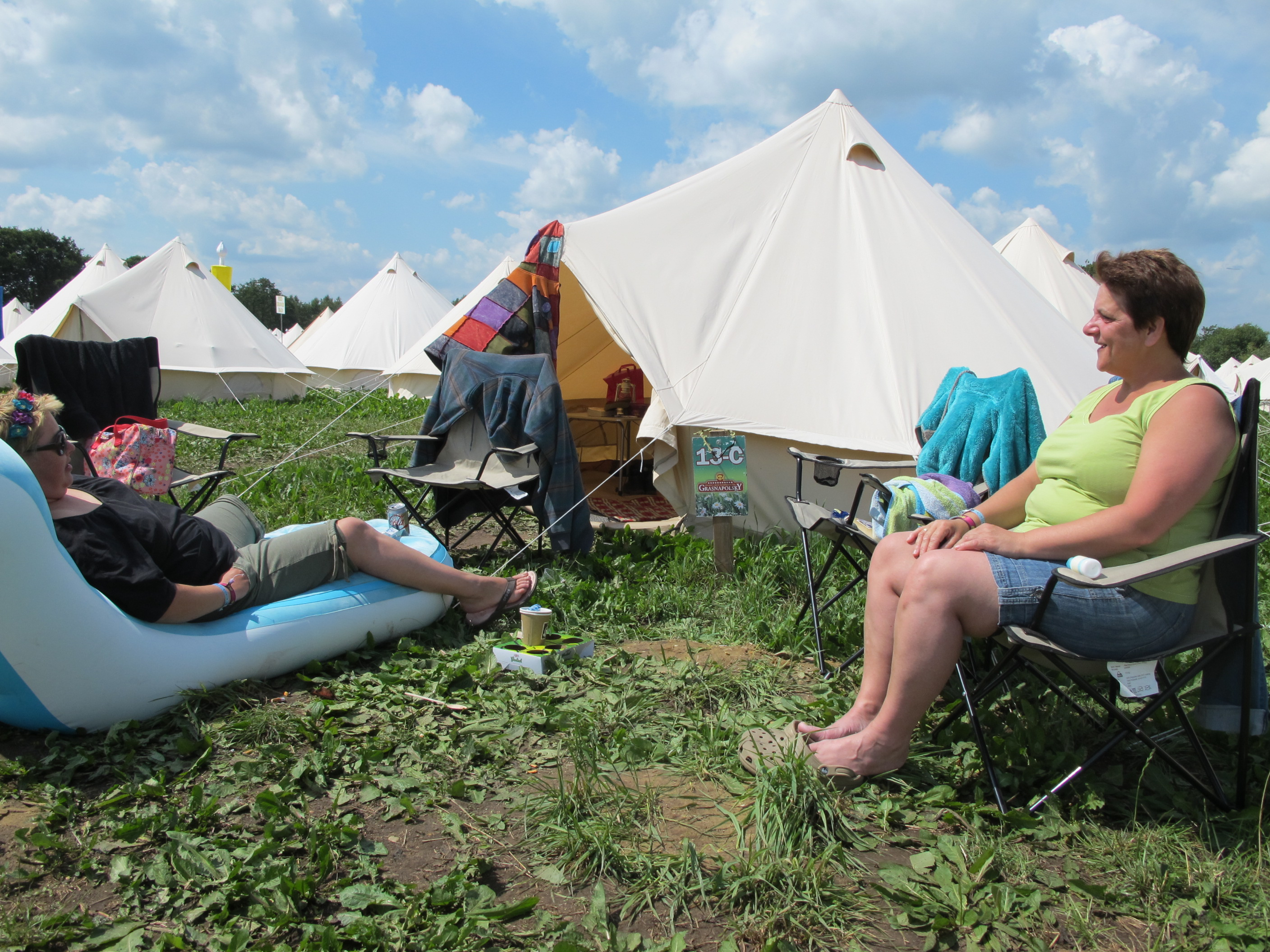
Glamping at the music festival Zwarte Cross in the Netherlands

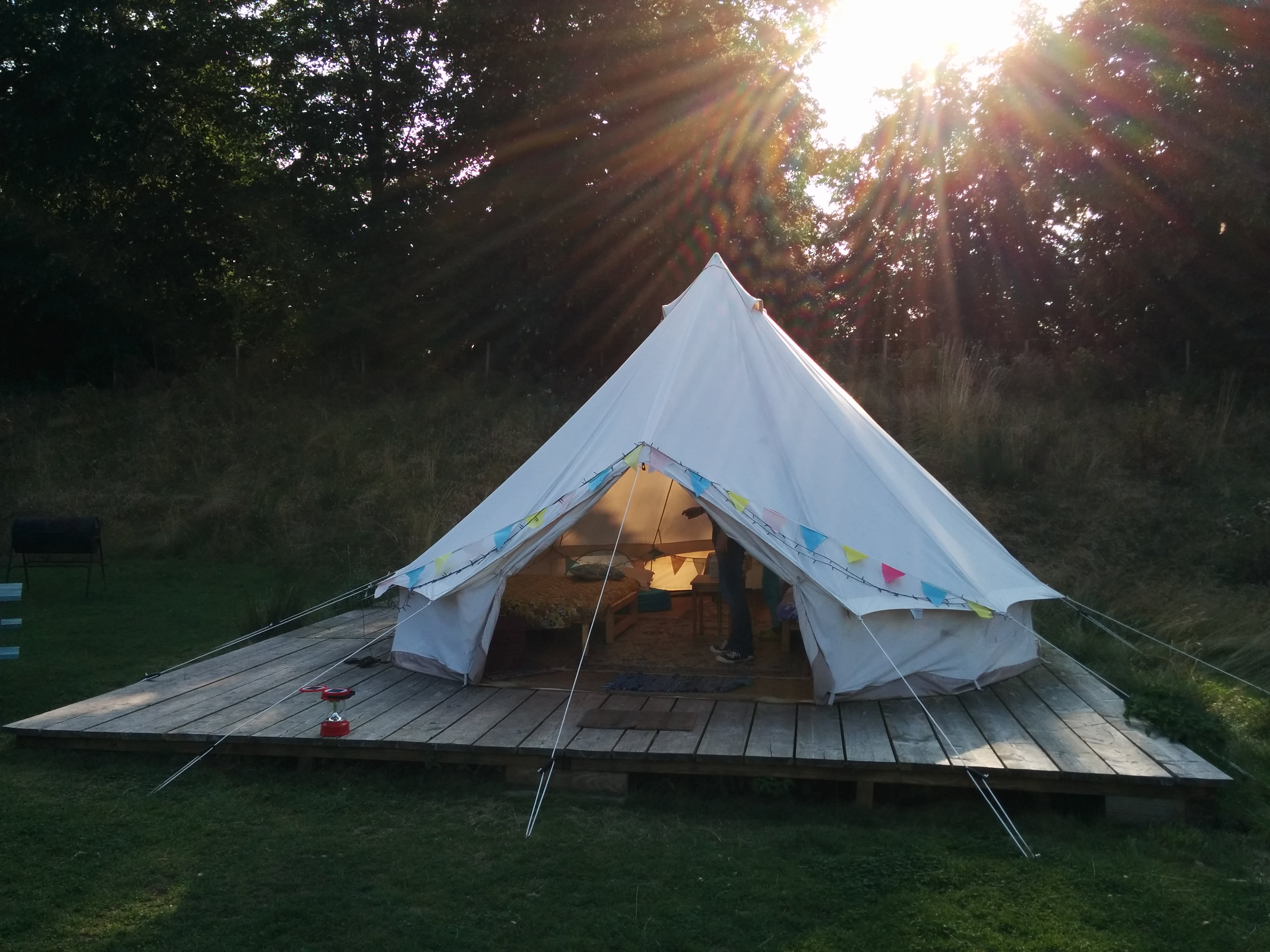
A glamping hut at Norwich, United Kingdom

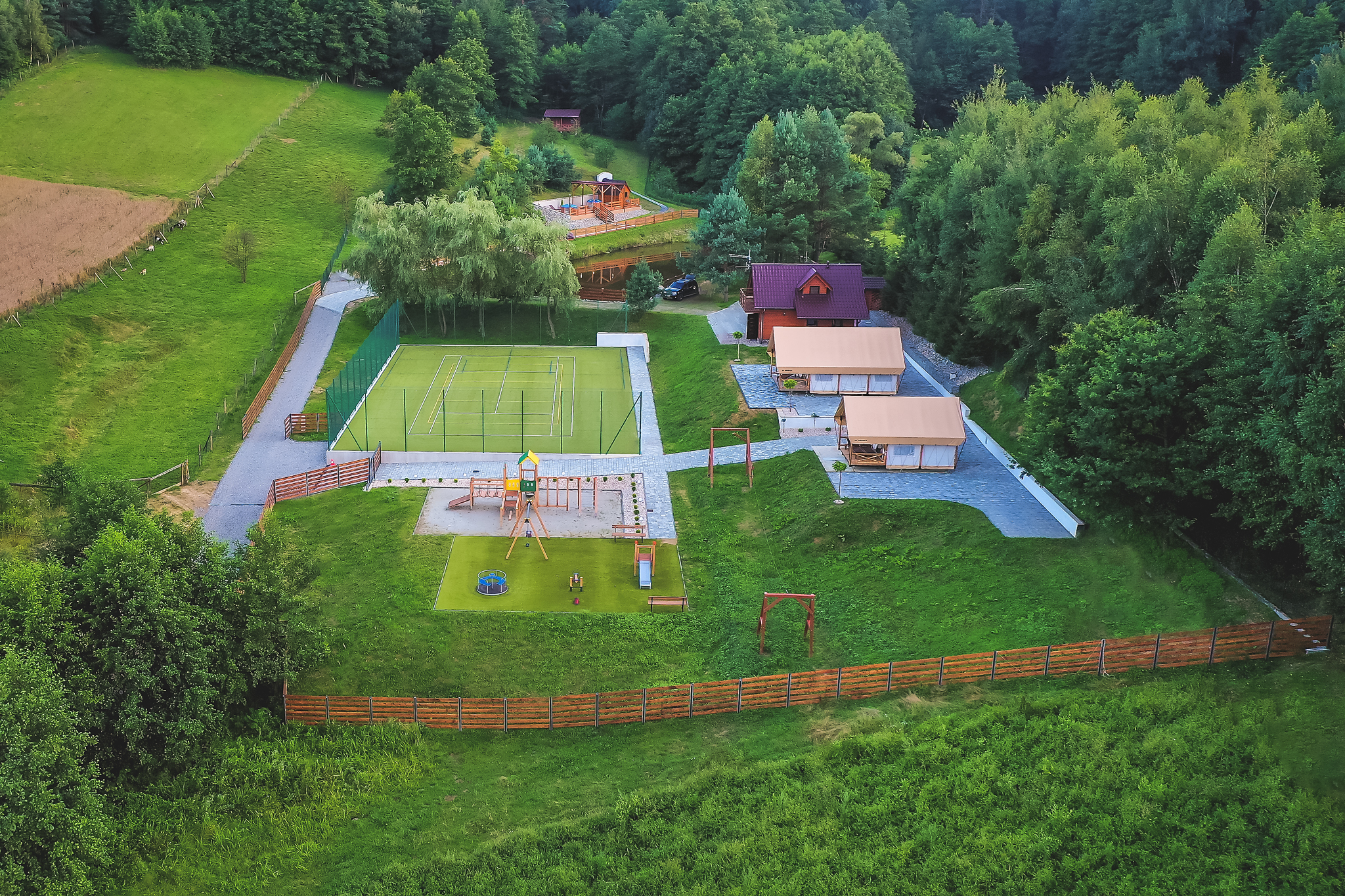
Glamping "Pod Gwiazdami", Pietrusza Wola, Poland

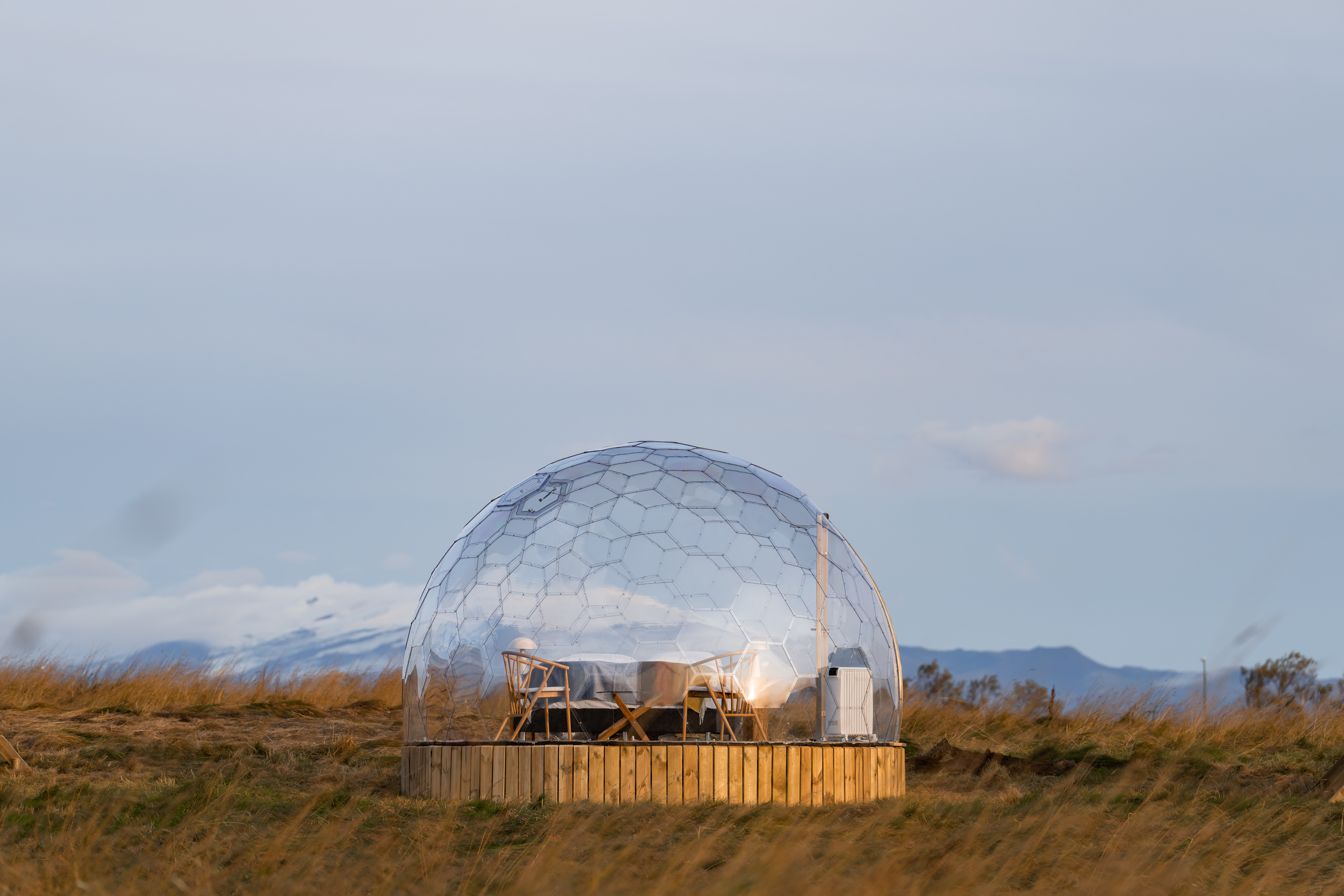
Glamping dome designed for Northern Lights watching in Hella, Iceland

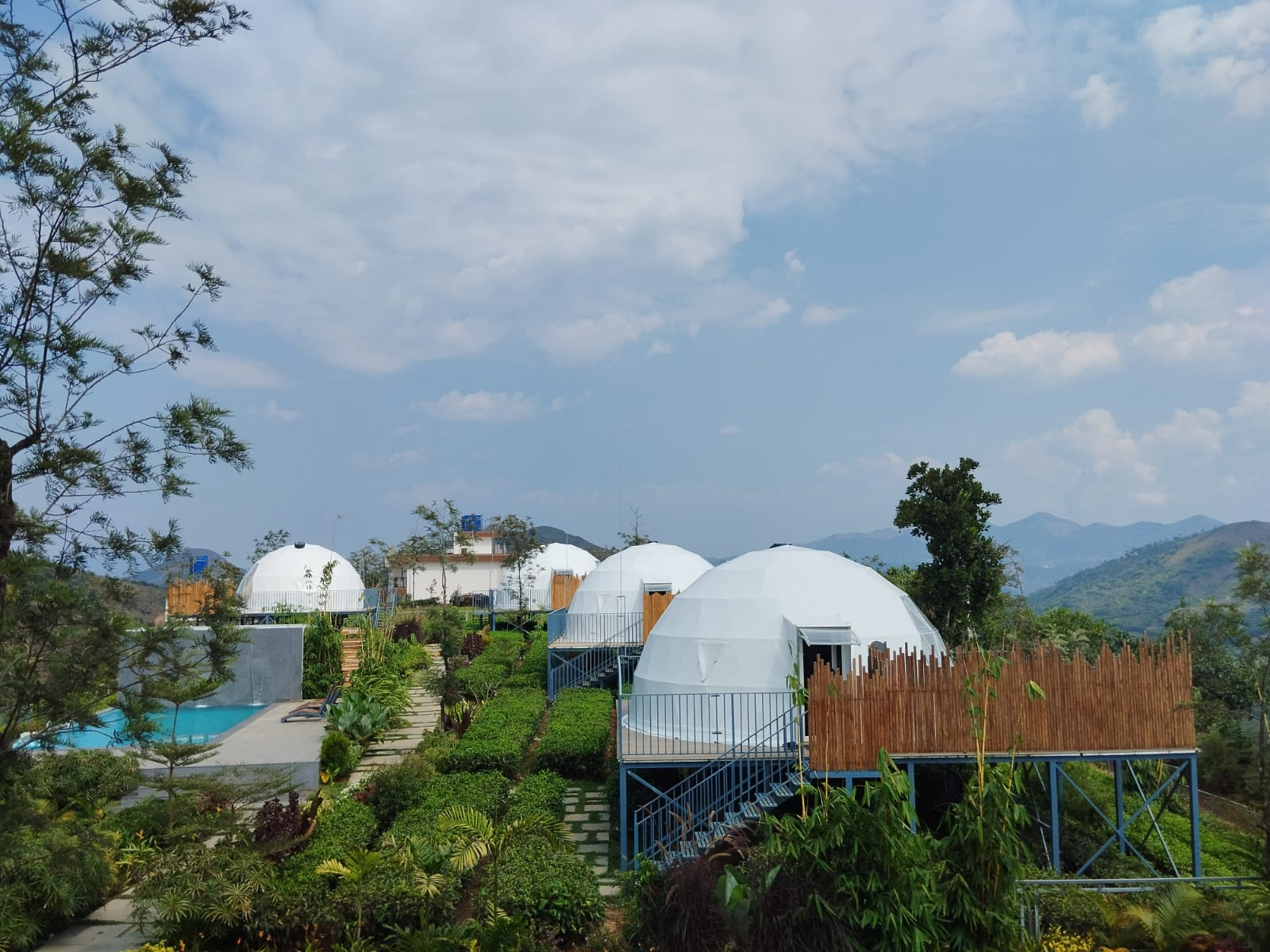
Glamps in a private resort in Vagamon, Kerala, India

== Mexico ==
Mexico is a significant glamping destination in Latin America, covering Riviera Maya and the Yucatán Peninsula, interior colonial towns, and desert-and-coast settings in Baja California. Market analysis firm IMARC Group estimated the Mexico glamping market at USD 47.9 million in 2025 and projected growth to USD 124.5 million by 2034, a compound annual growth rate of 10.64%. Growth has been attributed to rising demand for sustainable, low-density tourism as an alternative to conventional resorts, and to Mexico's inbound tourism volume, estimated at about 45 million international tourists in 2024.

Tented hotels in Mexico range from beachfront properties on the Caribbean coast to jungle and cenote-side camps in the interior, to desert camps in Baja California. Properties in the Riviera Maya often feature permanent tented structures with private bathrooms, air conditioning, and restaurant service.

== See also ==
- Bell tent
- Ecotourism
- Shepherd's hut
- Tree house
- Van-dwelling
- Yurt
- Dispersed camping
- Safari
