= Greenwich Heritage Centre =

Former museum in Woolwich, London, England

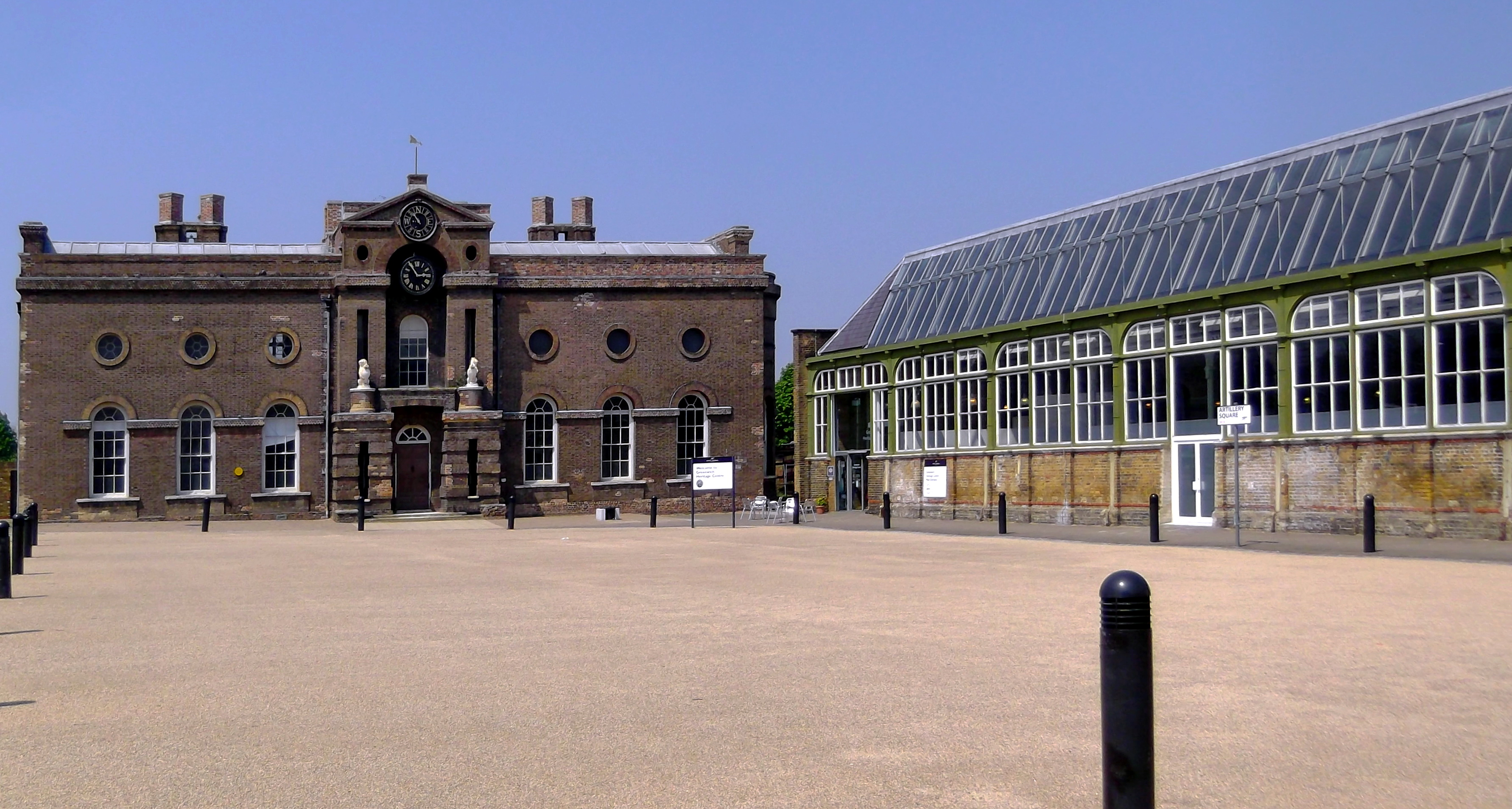
- Artillery Square with the Old Royal Military Academy and Greenwich Heritage Centre

- Location within Royal Borough of Greenwich
- Established: October 2003
- Location: Royal Arsenal, Woolwich, South East London
- Coordinates: 51°29′40″N 0°04′09″E
- Public transit access: Woolwich Arsenal
- Website: Official website

Greenwich Heritage Centre was a museum and local history resource centre located in Woolwich, southeast London, England. Established in 2003 by the London Borough of Greenwich, it was managed by the Royal Greenwich Heritage Trust from 2014 until its closure in July 2018. The museum was based in a historic building in Artillery Square, in the Royal Arsenal complex, which was established in the 17th century as a repository and manufactory of heavy guns, ammunition and other military ware.

== History of the building ==
The Greenwich Heritage Centre was in the western and southern range of a quadrangle of buildings known as New Laboratory Square or Building 41, a former storehouse designed by James Wyatt, dating from 1783 to 1785. The storehouse was built by the Board of Ordnance as a "sea storehouse" (a repository for naval ordnance supplies). Further storehouses were added to form the north and east sides of the square in 1808–10. By 1860 the whole complex had been taken over by the Royal Laboratory department and converted into a factory to make boxes and barrels for the storage and carriage of ammunition, powder, cartridges, fuses and other items; the west range contained the wood store, the east range had a sawmill with a cooperage above it, the north range contained a steam engine, which powered the machinery by way of line shafting.

The entrance of the Greenwich Heritage Centre was in the south wing of the quadrangle, a former carpenters' workshop of 1877-78 where boxes and barrels were machine-assembled. By the time of the First World War this space had been given over to the manufacture of ammunition for small arms. At the end of the war many women were at work here. In the years leading up to the closure of the Arsenal in 1994, much of the building was in use as Customs and Excise stores.

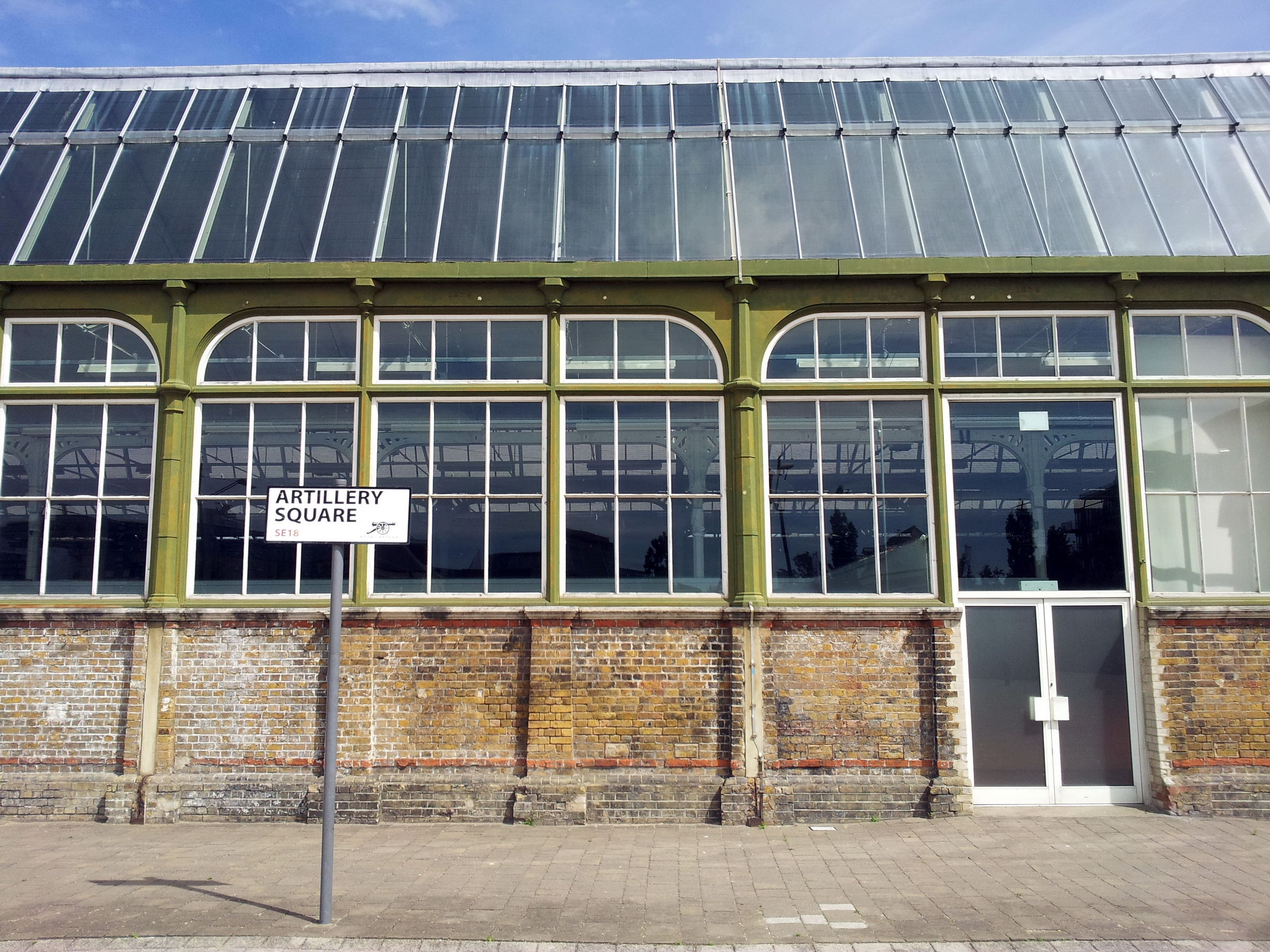
Detail of the south range of New Laboratory Square

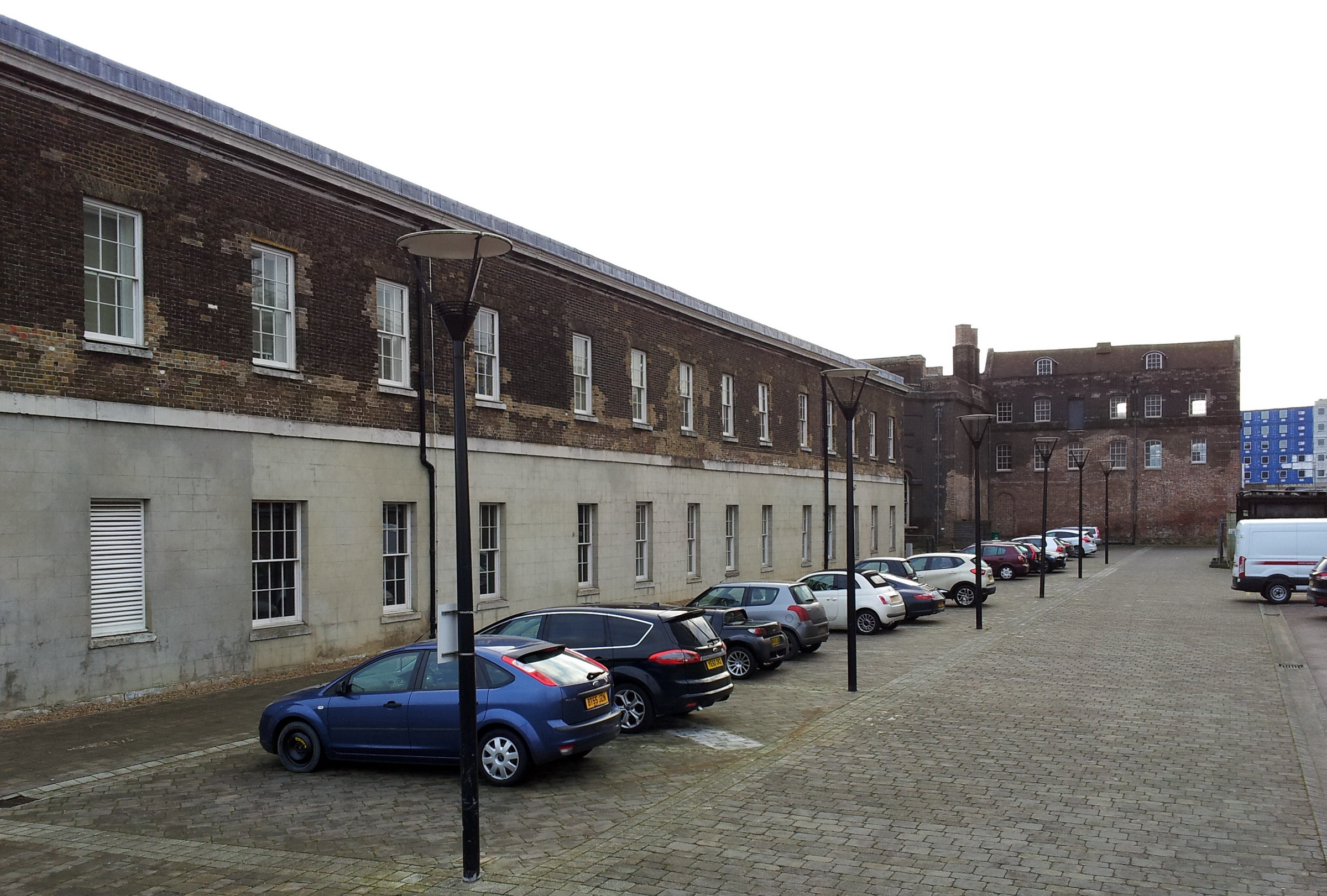
The west range and the back of the Old Royal Military Academy

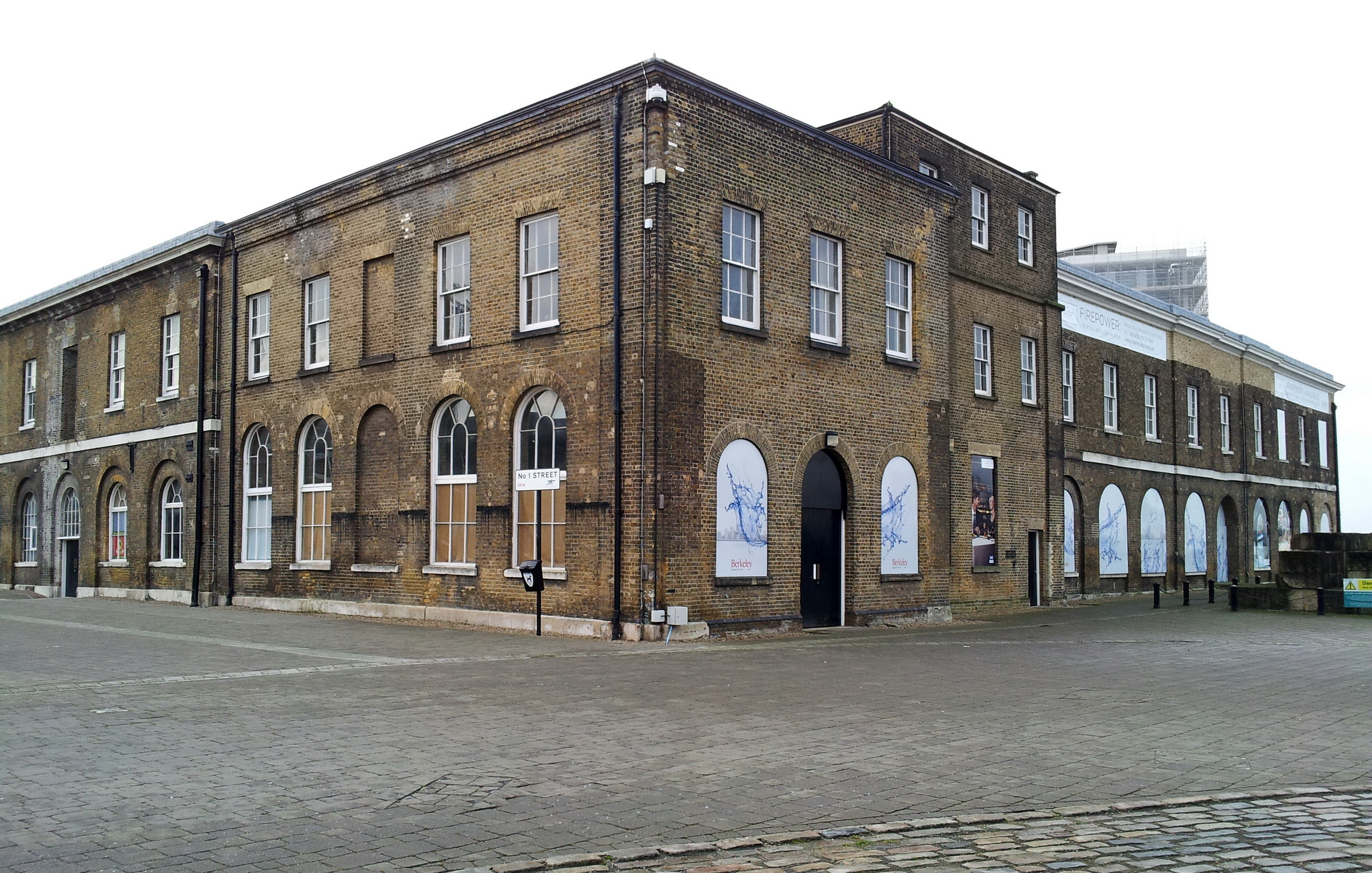
East and north range

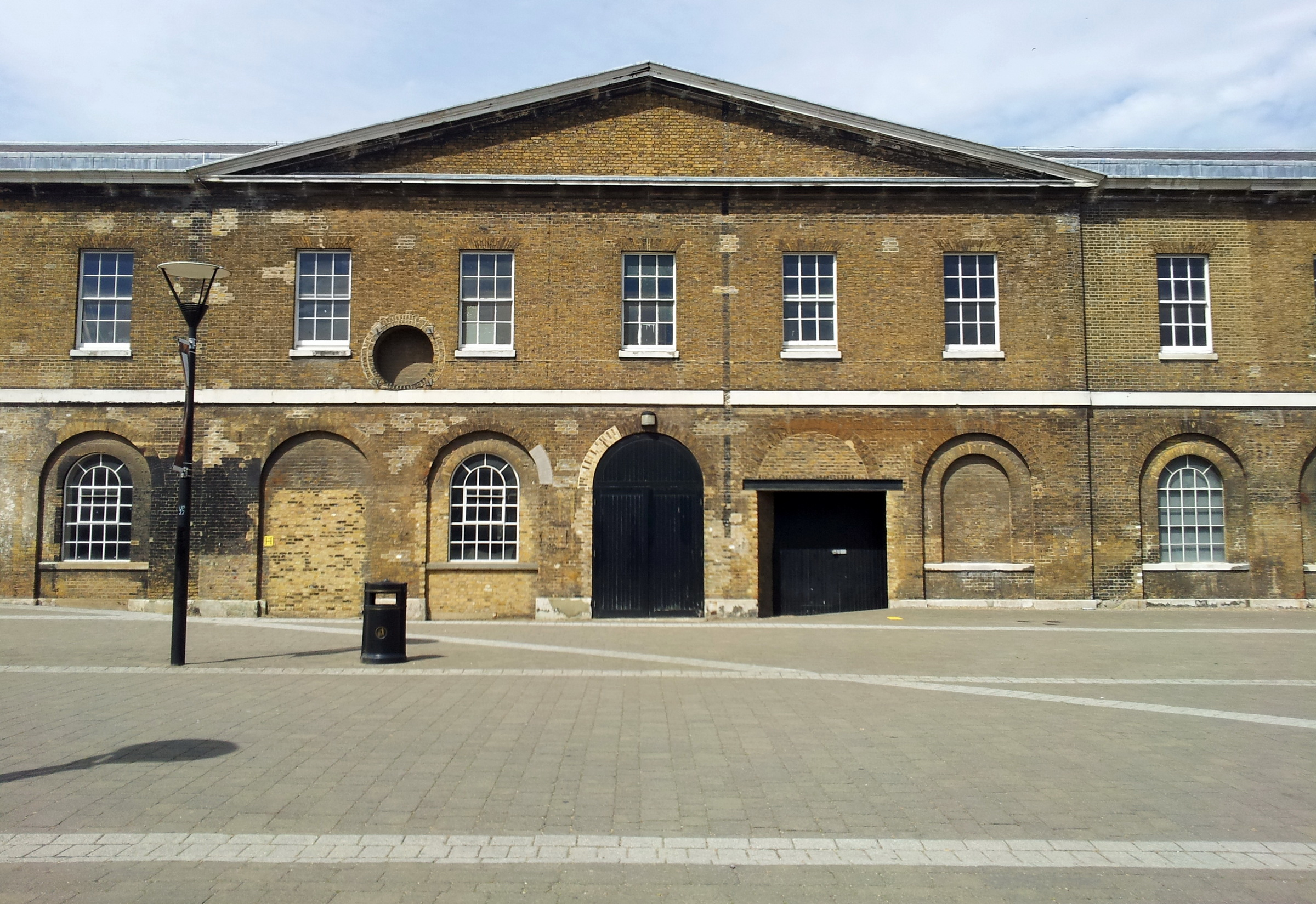
East range; barrels would leave the first-floor by way of the round hole (left)

== History of the museum and closure ==
The Greenwich Heritage Centre was established in October 2003, combining collections from the Greenwich Borough Museum and the local history library, previously at Woodlands House in Westcombe Park. The establishing of a museum of local history in this area was motivated by the council's desire to support the refurbishment of the Royal Arsenal and make it a desirable place to live and visit. It was preceded in 2001 by the move of the Royal Artillery Museum from its historic location at the Rotunda to a disused building at the Arsenal where it took the name Firepower – The Royal Artillery Museum.

New Laboratory Square was restored by English Partnerships and the London Development Agency in 1999–2002, after plans by Llewyn-Davies architects. Initially the museum only used the west range of the building, while sharing the south range with Firepower. The rest of the building was used as storage by Firepower until its closure in 2016.

In 2014 a new charity, the Royal Greenwich Heritage Trust (RGHT), was formed to manage the museum and archives as well as Charlton House, The Tudor Barn in Eltham and certain other heritage assets in the Borough. The RGHT is supported by the Friends of the Royal Greenwich Heritage Trust.

In 2017 it was announced that the borough had plans to create a £31 million creative district around the riverside end of No 1 Street. The plan includes a 1200-seat auditorium for concerts and events in Building 41.

The closure of the centre in July 2018 was criticised as being sudden and without consultation, with unclear plans as to its future, although the Trust said it planned to continue its research. It moved the borough's archives and museum collections into a single store in the Anchorage Point Industrial Estate on Anchor and Hope Lane in the Woolwich Dockyard area in the following years and - though that facility's opening has been delayed by the COVID-19 pandemic - it is to remain unaffected by a new school planned for the road unless road improvement works follow.

== Exhibitions ==
Upon its opening, the museum featured a permanent exhibition titled "Inside the Arsenal," detailing the history of the Royal Arsenal and the nearby Woolwich Dockyard. A section of this exhibition was entitled Here Come The Girls, celebrating the role of women in wartime Woolwich, particularly during the First World War.

In 2016, following the closure of the Firepower museum across the road, a second permanent exhibition Making Woolwich: The Royal Regiment of Artillery in Woolwich was set up to fill the gap. This exhibition was in the south wing of the building marked the 300th anniversary of the formation of the Royal Regiment of Artillery in Woolwich in 1716. Even though the main theme was the Royal Artillery, some of the objects on display related to the Royal Military Academy, Woolwich (1741-1939).

Apart from these, the museum usually had one or two changing exhibitions per year. These generally focused on a specific area in the borough, a historic event or other topics of local interest. The temporary Berkeley Gallery was replaced by the Making Woolwich exhibition.

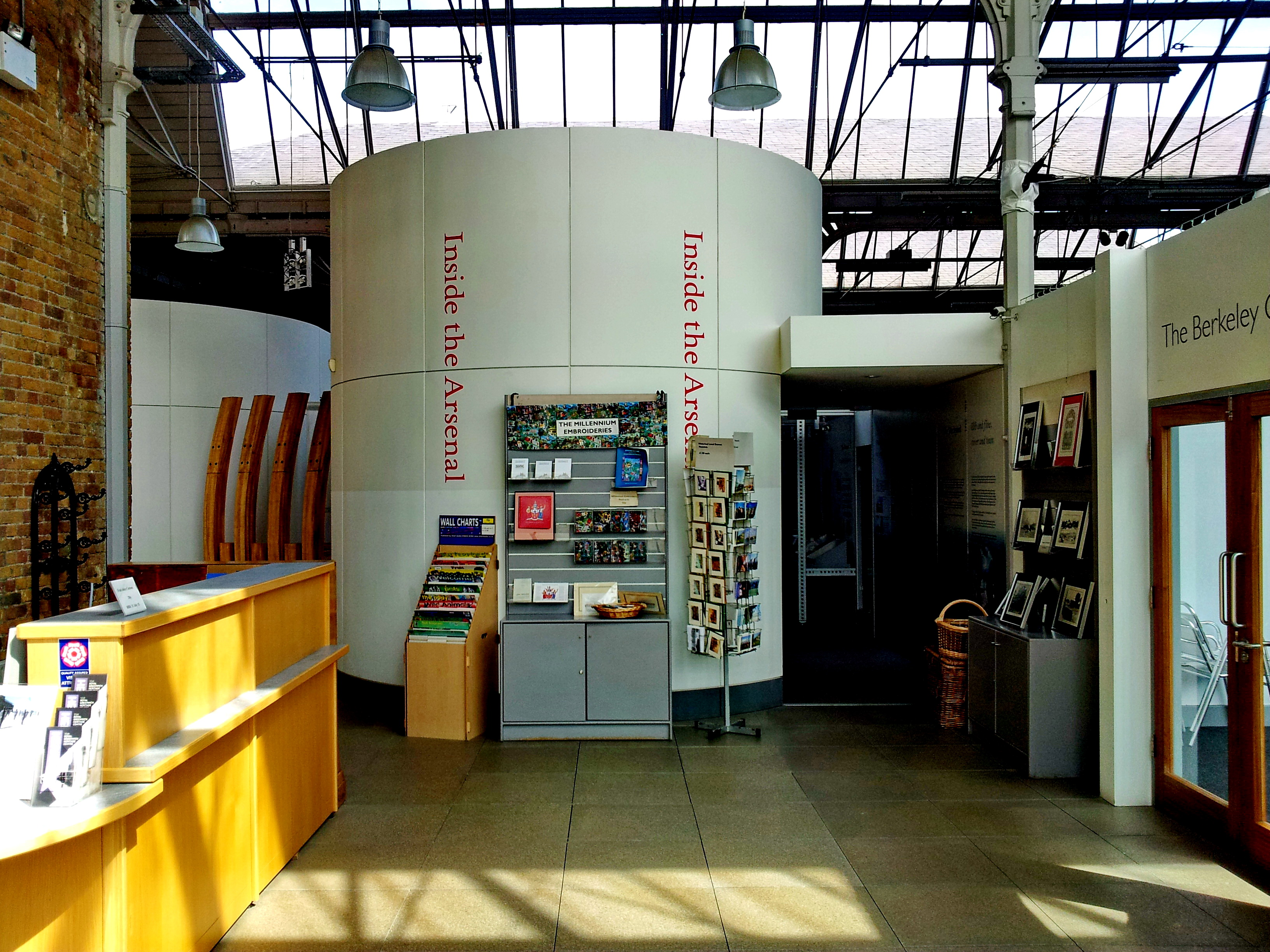
Reception area. To the right the former Berkeley Gallery

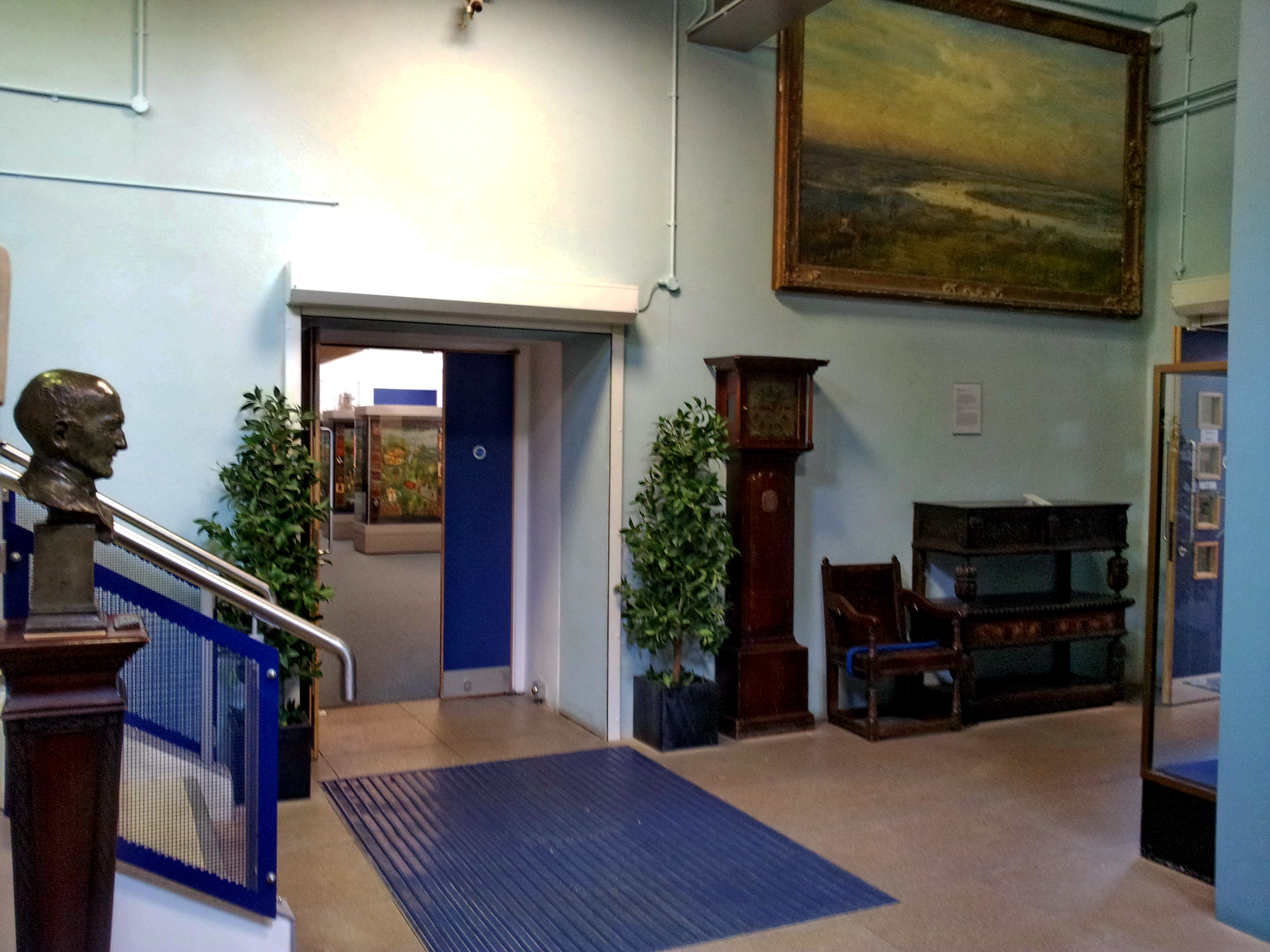
Local history section. Stairs to first floor

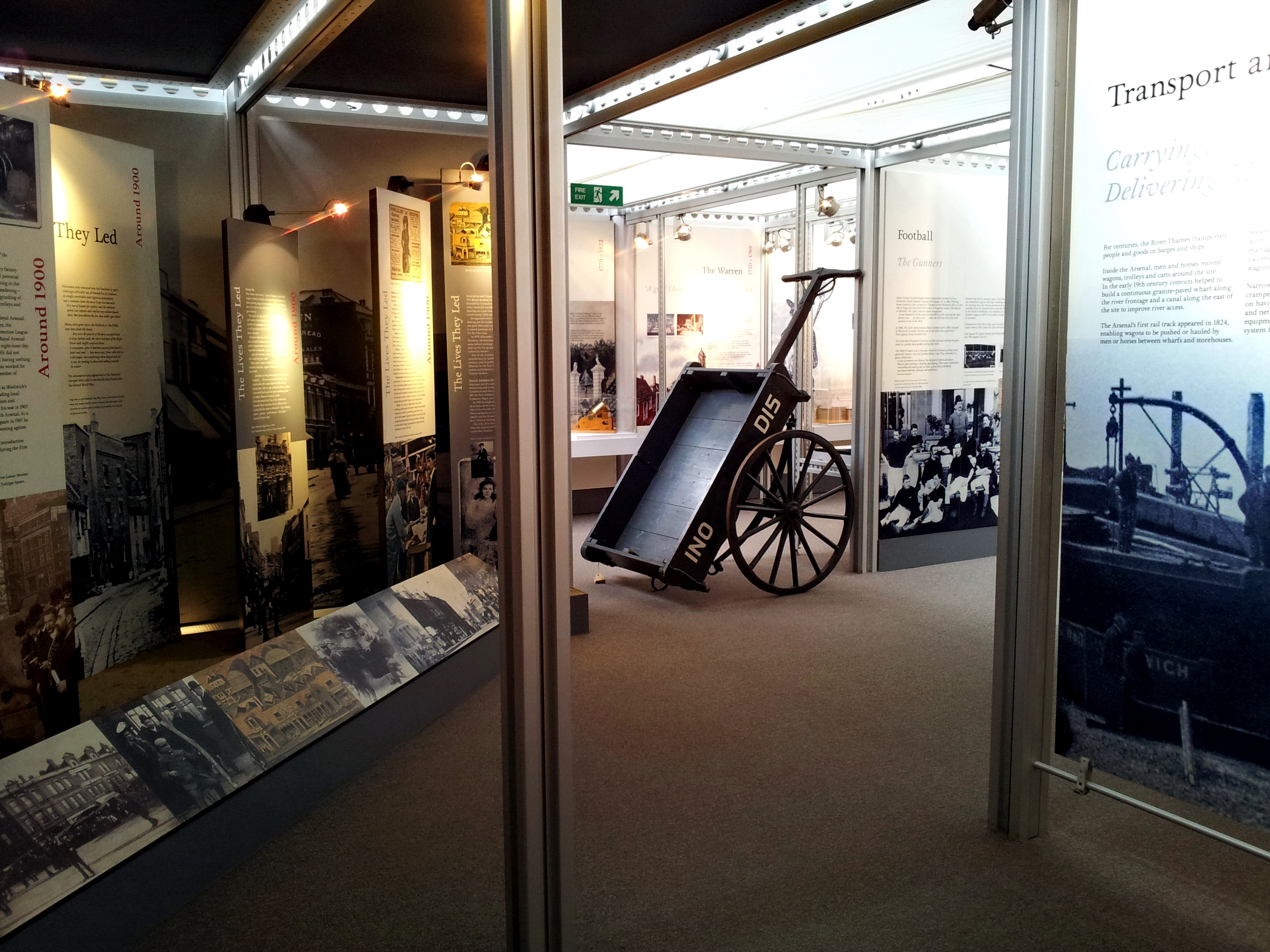
Permanent exhibition Inside the Arsenal

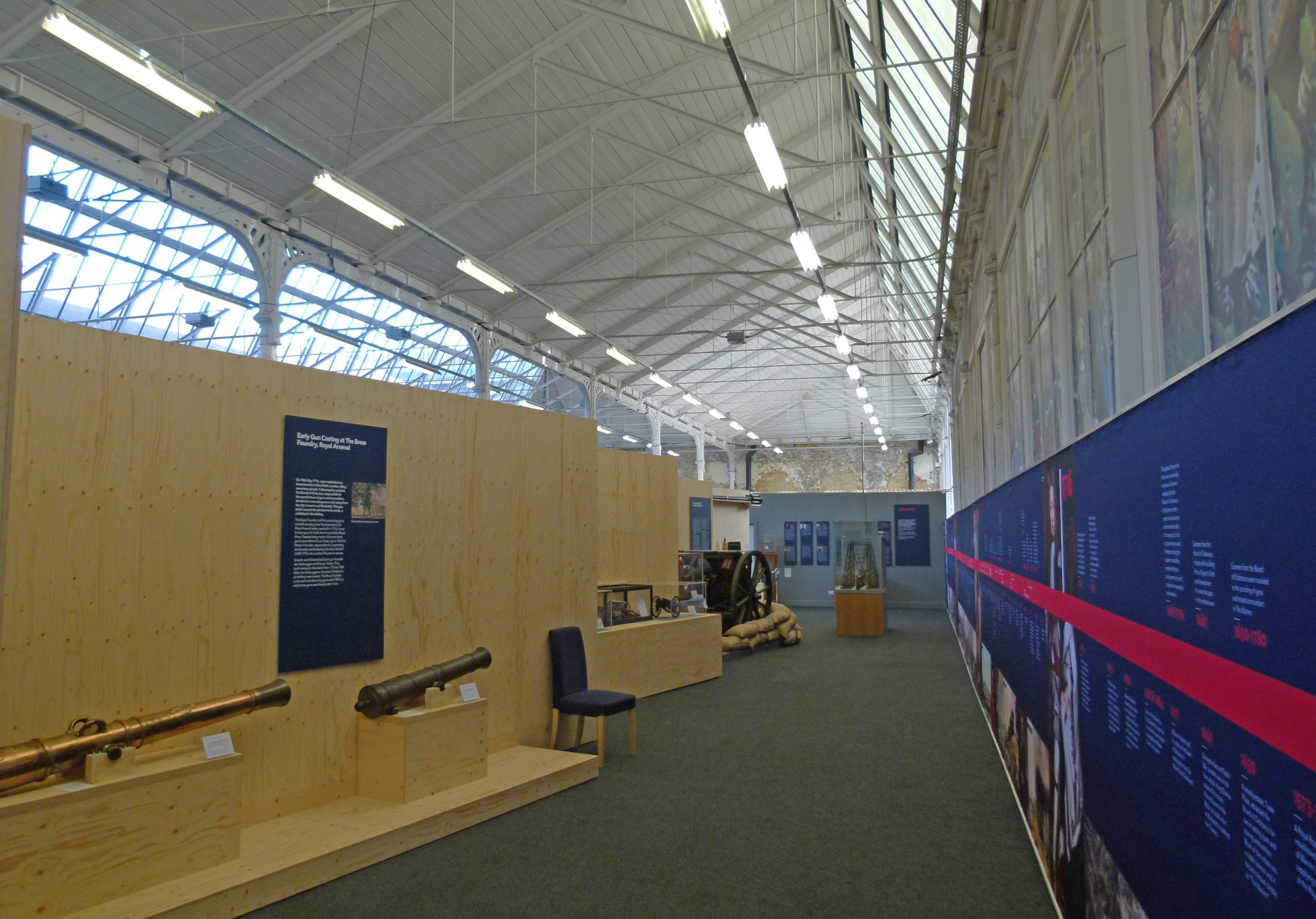
Permanent exhibition Making Woolwich

== Notes and references ==
- Saint, A., Guillery, P. (ed.), Woolwich – Survey of London, Volume 48, Yale Books, London, 2012. ISBN 978 0 300 18722 9

== See also ==
- Discover Greenwich Visitor Centre - which focuses on the Greenwich World Heritage Site
