= Sibley tent =

Conical tent design patented in 1856

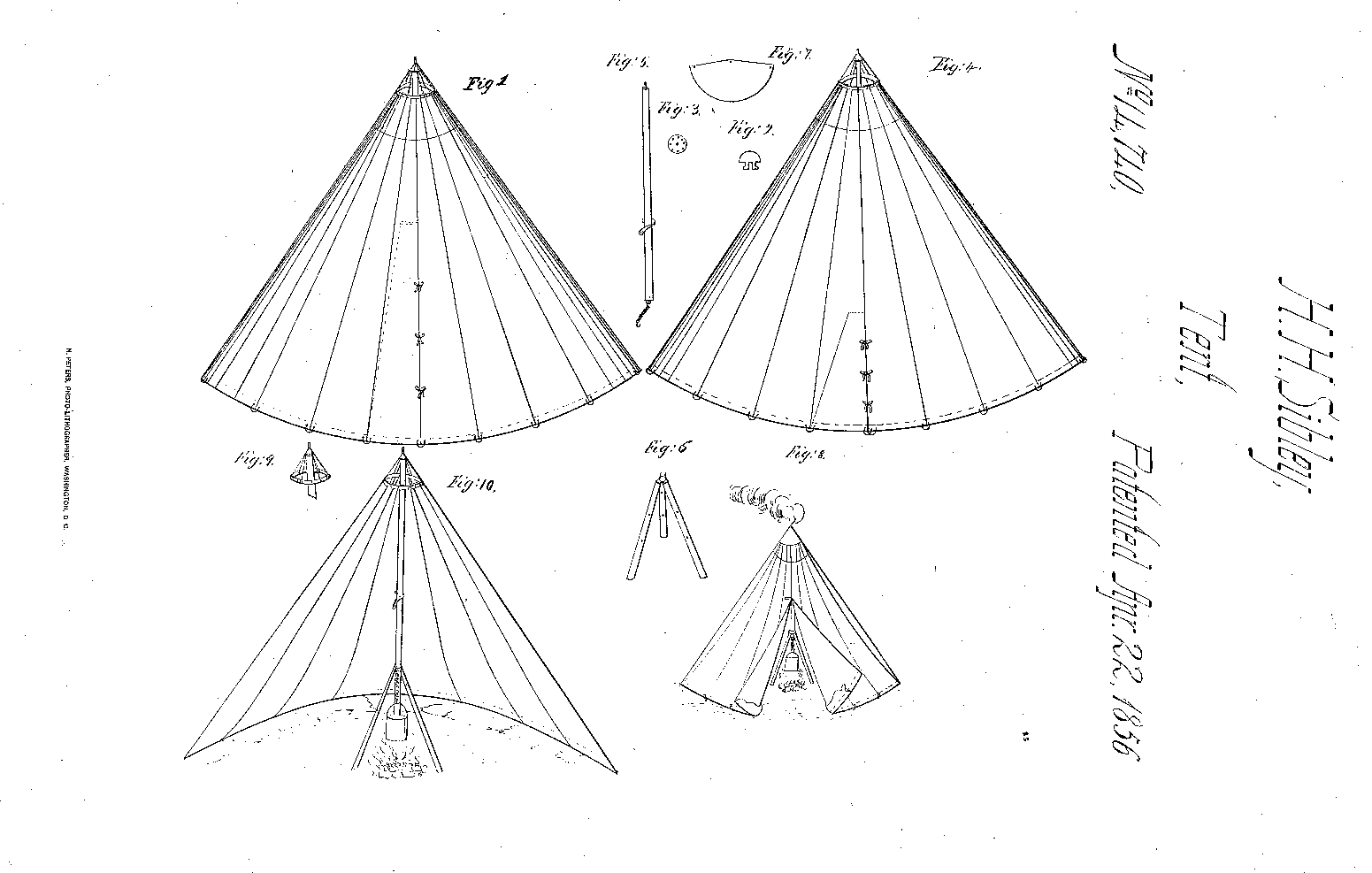
U.S. patent 14,740, showing Sibley's claim for his tent

The Sibley tent was invented by the American military officer Henry Hopkins Sibley and patented in 1856. Of conical design, it stands about 12 feet (3.7 m) high and 18 feet (5.5 m) in diameter. It can comfortably house about a dozen men.

The Sibley design differed from other conical tents, or bell tents, in a number of ways. Sibley's design is supported by a central pole that telescopes down into the supporting tripod so that it takes less space to pack and store. The tripod could be erected over a firepit for cooking and heat. The Sibley design also required no guy ropes, being held down by twenty-four pegs around the base. Unlike earlier designs, the use of a cowl over the central pole allowed for ventilation and for the escape of smoke, regardless of wind direction.

== History ==
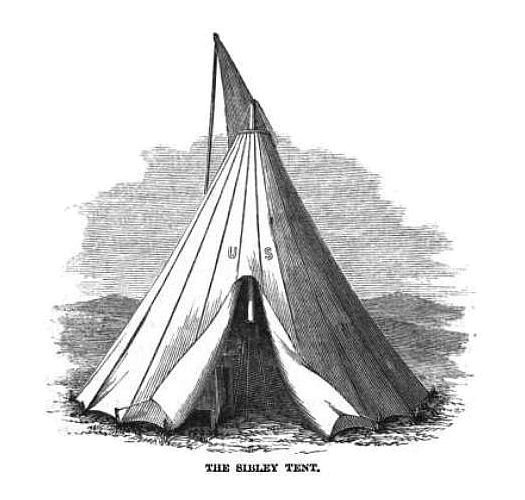
"The Sibley Tent"—The Prairie Traveler (1859)

The US Patent Office granted Sibley his patent April 22, 1856 (no. 14,740). The US Army used the tent exclusively during the Utah Expedition during the winter of 1857–58, proving the design. Some Plains Indian Wars veterans noted the tent's similarity to Indian lodges, including the smoke hole, the tent pegs around the outer edge, and the fire pit.

In accordance with an 1858 agreement with the Department of War, Sibley would receive US$5 for every tent made. However, Sibley resigned from the US Army to join the Confederate States Army after the outbreak of the American Civil War. He received no royalties on his patent. The Union Army produced and used nearly 44,000 Sibley tents during the war.

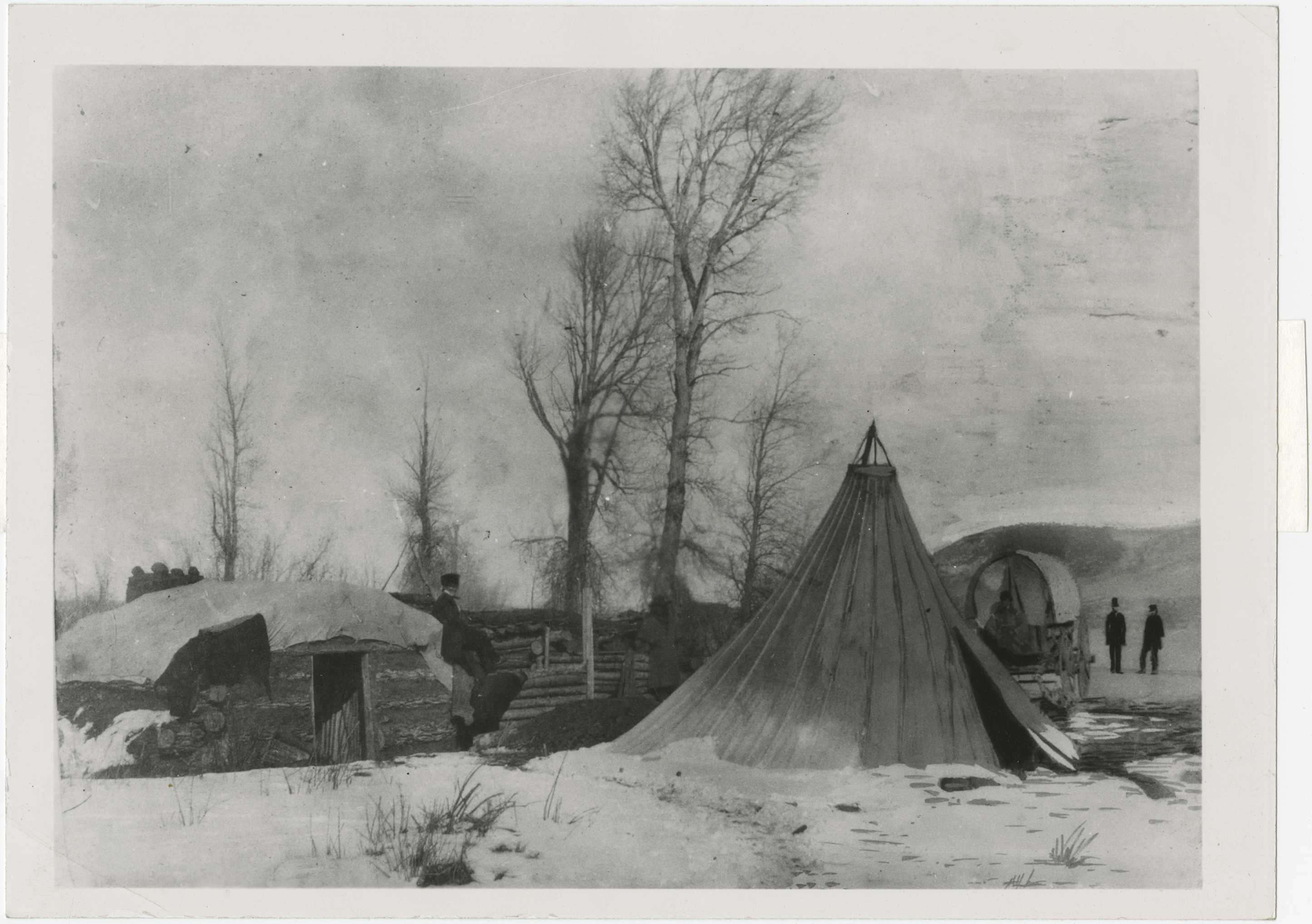
A Sibley tent at Camp Floyd in Fairfield, Utah

After Sibley's death, his relatives attempted unsuccessfully to collect the royalties from the War Department.

== See also ==
- Tipi

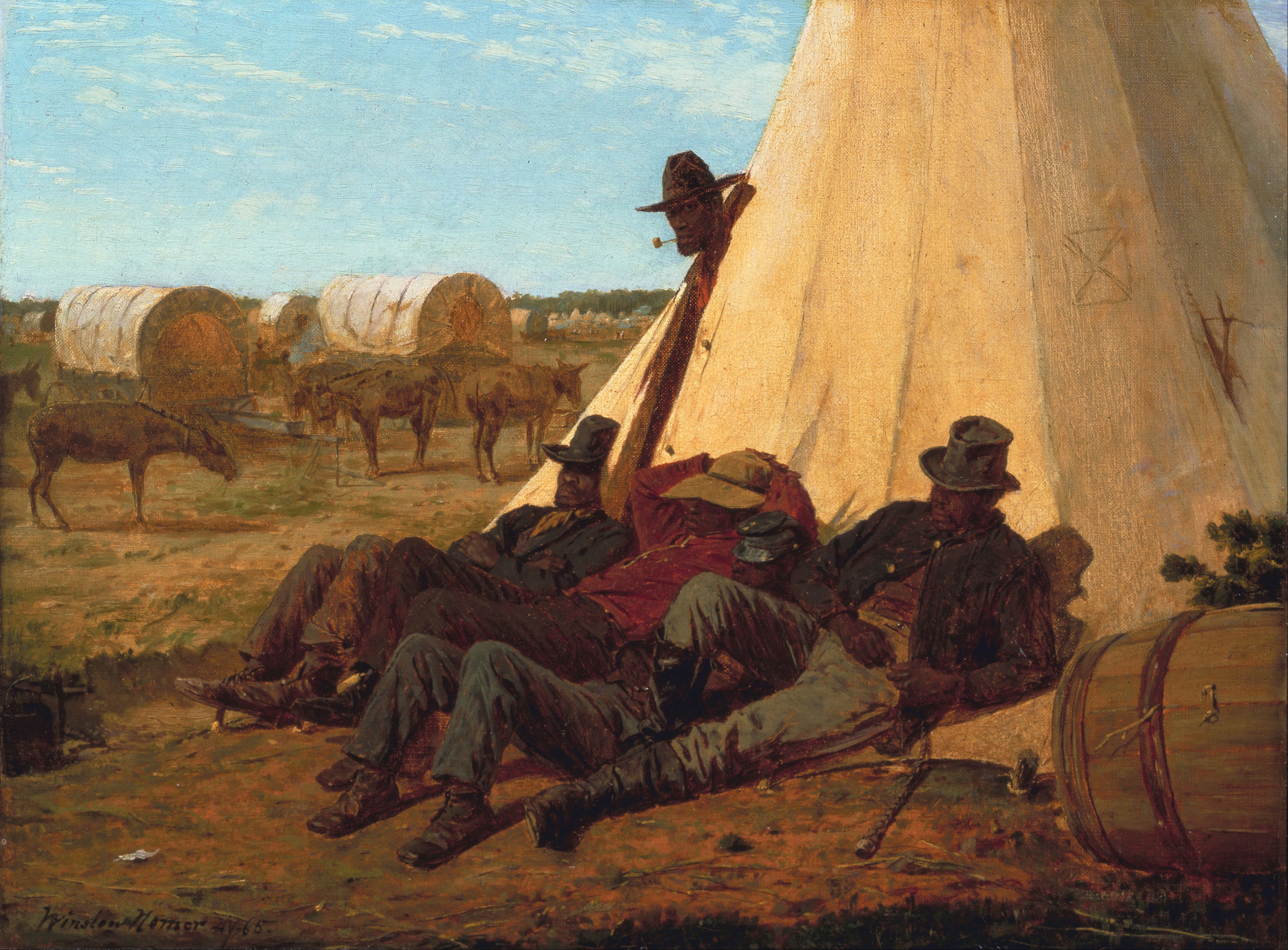
The Bright Side, 1862–1863, by Winslow Homer

== References and notes ==
Bibliography

- Billings, John D. Hardtack and Coffee: Or, The Unwritten Story of Army Life. Boston: George M. Smith & Co. (1887).
- Harrington, Charles, M.D. A Manual of Practical Hygiene, for Students, Physicians, and Medical Officers. Philadelphia: Lea Brothers & Co. (1902).
- Marcy, Randolph B., Capt. The Prairie Traveler: A Hand-Book for Overland Expeditions. New York: Harper & Brothers, Publishers (1859).
- Sibley, H.H. "Conical Tent", U.S. Patent No. 14,740: United States Patent Office (April 22, 1856).

Citations
