= The Bright Side (painting) =

Painting by Winslow Homer

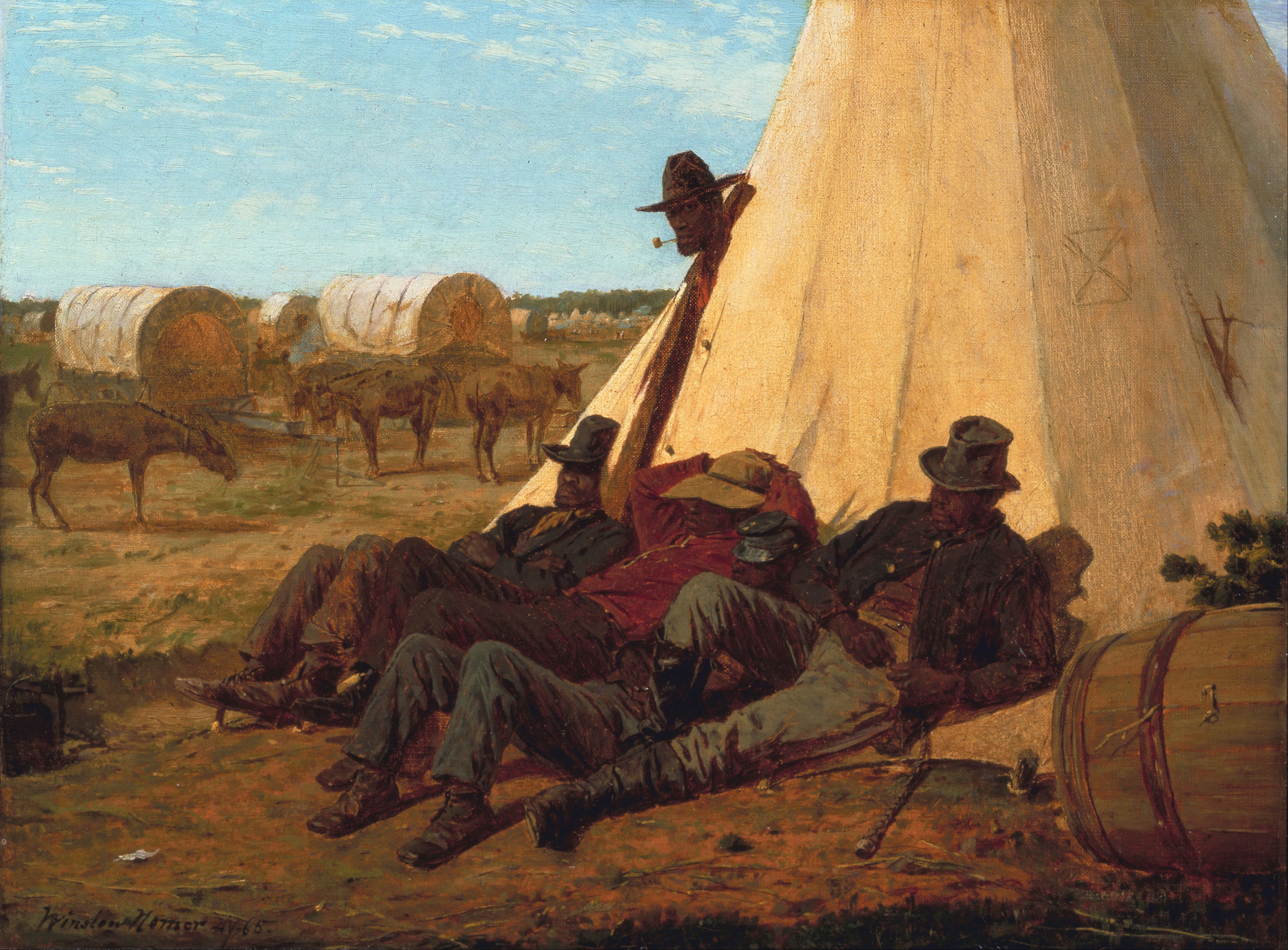
- Artist: Winslow Homer
- Year: 1865
- Medium: Oil on canvas
- Dimensions: 32.4 cm × 43 cm (12.75 in × 17 in)
- Location: de Young Museum, San Francisco
- Accession: 1979.7.56

The Bright Side is an oil painting by the American artist Winslow Homer. Painted in 1865, the concluding year of the American Civil War, the work depicts four African American Union Army teamsters sitting on the sunny side of a Sibley tent. The painting is in the collection of the Fine Arts Museums of San Francisco-(De Young)

Its dimensions are 33.7 cm (13.27 in.) x 44.5 cm (17.52 in.)

From November 2012 to September 2013, the painting was on display at the Smithsonian American Art Museum.

== Background ==
Early in his artistic career, Homer apprenticed to a lithographer creating images for sheet music and other publications. After the apprenticeship ended, he began making illustrations on a regular freelance basis for the magazine Harper’s Weekly. When the Civil War began, Harper's made him an artist-correspondent with the Army of the Potomac. Over the next few years, the artist directly witnessed and recorded life in the Union Army.

Homer made many sketches that served as the basis for illustrations for the magazine. Toward the end of the war, he began using them for his own paintings, including The Bright Side. The work is acknowledged as Homer's transition from illustrator to painter. Its subject matter and small size mark the piece as illustration, while its style points to Homer's future as a realist painter.

== Description ==
Although they received far less pay and suffered higher mortality rates than their white counterparts, nearly 190,000 African Americans, both free and fugitive, served as Union soldiers. Some worked as teamsters driving mule- and horse-drawn wagons in exposed supply trains targeted by Confederate raiders. If captured, the teamsters were frequently enslaved or executed.

The year after his death, the following description of The Bright Side appeared in the catalog for a retrospective of Homer's work.

“Four Negro teamsters are lying in the sun against the side of a tent. The man at the right wears a battered high hat, a military coat, and top boots, and holds a whip in his left hand; beyond his raised knee is the head of the second figure in a peaked military cap. The next one wears a red shirt and broad-brimmed gray hat, and his hands are clasped back of his head; the farthest one, with arms folded, wears a broad-brimmed military hat. In the opening of the tent is the head of another [N]egro with a broad-brimmed hat; a corn-cob pipe is in his mouth. Beyond, at the left, are commissariat wagons with rounded canvas tops, and near by (sic) are unharnessed mules. In the distance is the camp. In the immediate foreground, at the right, part of a barrel shows.”

== Critical reception ==
In 1865, Homer was elected to the National Academy of Design. That year, he sent three paintings to the academy's Fortieth Annual Exhibition in New York City. Critics thought The Bright Side to be his strongest work of the three, in terms of both subject matter and execution.

According to the critic for The Evening Post, the work possessed a “direct style and faithful observation of nature.” He also found in the painting “a dry, latent humor and vigorous emphasis of character..” Today, Homer's reputation as one of America's greatest realist painters coincides with the critic's view of him as an artist quite capable of rendering a truthful scene.

The description of the piece as humorous is less understandable, since Homer rarely injected levity into his work. Although, art historian Jennifer A. Greenhill argues that levity is a popular trope in Homer's paintings. However, in light of 19th century white male thinking, many viewers, including some art critics, saw the painting as a stereotypical reference to the perceived inherent laziness of dark-skinned people.

== Interpretation and controversy ==
Scholars have long debated the painting's meaning and whether it was Homer's intention to reinforce prevailing stereotypes of African Americans.

The painting's title further adds to the confusion. The Bright Side is an obvious reference to the sunny side of the tent on which the teamsters rest. Some argue it may also allude to the Union "side" that promised freedom for enslaved people of color. Another interpretation, based on the painting's alternative title Light and Shade, suggests Homer is making a disparaging pun about color at the expense of his subjects. A fourth analysis describes the title as "ironic" because the men are former slaves freed as Union soldiers marched south. The teamsters are now in essence the property of the army, but on the "bright side", they are no longer bound in the cruel servitude that triggered the Civil War.

A current interpreter of Homer's oeuvre describes the painting as being of "special note." The" four black Union teamsters relax outside a tent, from which another pokes his head, clenching a pipe in his teeth and glaring at us. Here are men of rangy dignity, defying any objectifying gaze. Certainly, no contemporary white artist looked with clearer eyes than Homer did at formerly enslaved Americans. A Union man, he was hardly neutral, but his first allegiance was to truth." Another critic saw The Bright Side as referencing the Antebellum "uncertainty and ambivalence many white Americans felt about the prospect for an integrated society."

== Provenance ==
The Bright Side has had the following owners:

- William H. Hamilton, New York, 1865 to at least 1868
- Thomas B. Clarke, New York, by 1886–99
- Samuel P. Avery, Jr., New York, 1899–?
- William A. White, Brooklyn, by 1911–17
- Macbeth Galleries, New York, 1917–18 (sold for $500)
- Julia E. Peck, New York and Port Huron, Michigan, 1918–71
- Mrs. Richard Andrae, Port Huron, Michigan, 1971
- Schweitzer Gallery, New York, 1971–72
- John D. Rockefeller III and Blanchette Hooker Rockefeller, New York, 1972–79

In 1979, the Rockefellers donated the painting to the Fine Arts Museums of San Francisco.

== See also ==
- List of paintings by Winslow Homer
