= Rot-proof =

Protection from rotting

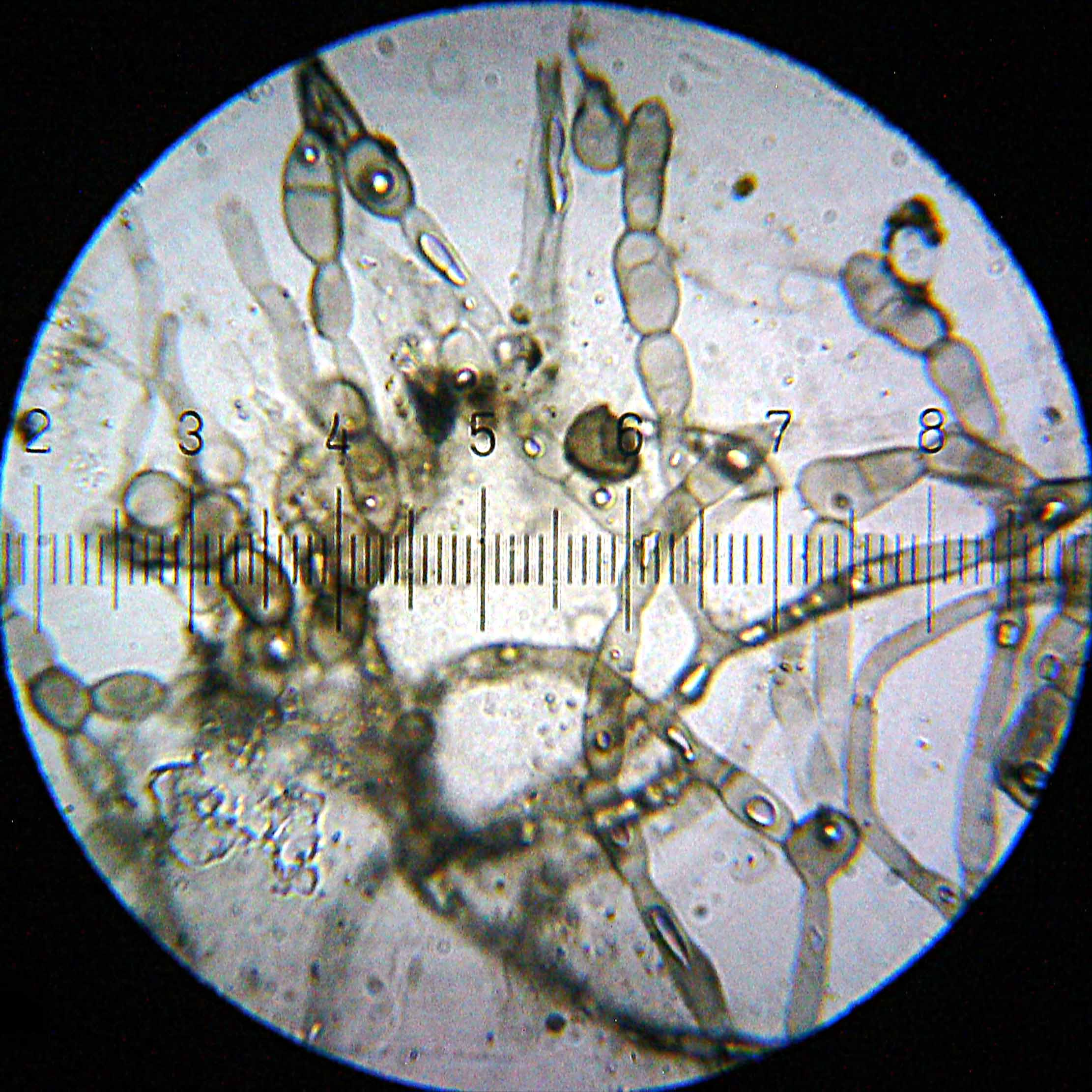
Mildew from wood

Rot-proof or rot resistant is a condition of preservation or protection, by a process or treatment of materials used in industrial manufacturing or production to prevent biodegradation and chemical decomposition. Decomposition is a factor in which organic matter breaks down over time. It is commonly caused by fungus, mold or mildew.

There are natural conditions where the environment is inhospitable to animals, bacteria and fungus, for example in high altitude and the freezing subzero temperatures of the Arctic and Antarctic, which creates a similar suspension. The proofing of materials may also prevent dry rot and wet rot.

== See also ==
- Dust resistant
- Fireproofing
- Rustproofing
- Thermal resistant
- Toughness
- Waterproofing
