= Bell tent =

Tent supported by a central pole

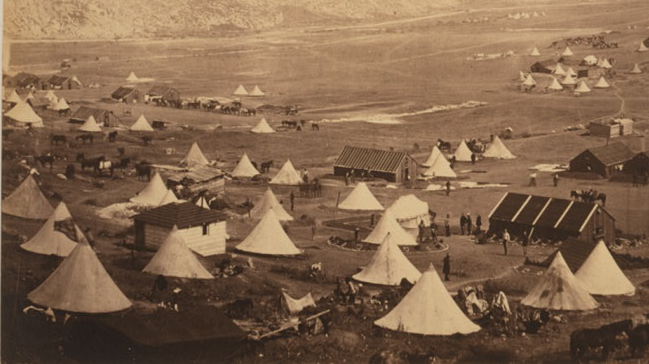
Bell tents used by the British cavalry during the Crimean War in 1855. Photograph by Roger Fenton.

A bell tent is a human shelter for inhabiting, traveling or leisure that has been used since 600AD. The design is a simple structure, supported by a single central pole, covered with cotton canvas. The stability of the tent is reinforced with tension by guy ropes connected around the top of the walls and being held down by pegs around the circumference to the ground. It has a circular floor plan of some 10 ft and larger.

The multiple sizes of bell tents can be suited to their use or preference and most have a spacious interior, with room to sleep a number of people.

== History ==
Indigenous people from around the world have used canvas as a natural breathable material, with suitable properties for use in the elements. Canvas is durable and versatile. Today's modern canvas can be waterproof, mildew resistant, and flame retardant.

A version of the bell tent, the sibley tent was invented by Henry Hopkins Sibley, who had studied the Native American tipi during the expeditions he carried out in the American Old West. He patented his tent design in 1858.

The bell tent is characteristically differentiated from the sibley tent by its walls, raised larger entrance and guy ropes, without the extendable tripod or smoke hole, which were characteristics of the tipi.

Bell tents have become the classic type of accommodation used in modern luxury camping, or glamping, often kitted out with electricity hook-up, double beds, carpeting, refrigeration units and even coffee machines.

== See also ==
- Wigwam
- Yurt
- Glamping
- Camping
