= Wellington Fete 1814 =

1814 entertainment at Carlton House, London

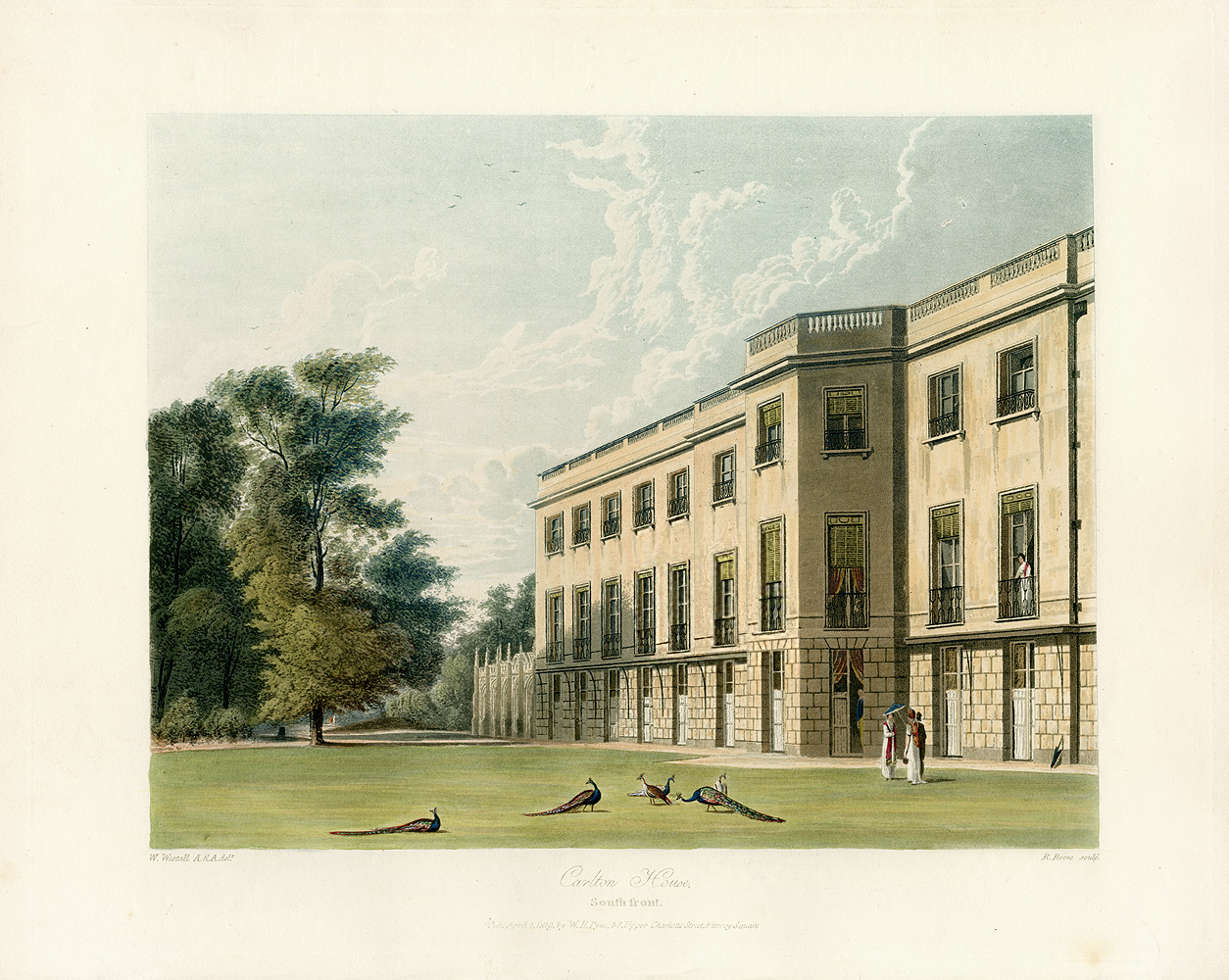
The garden front of Carlton House, where the temporary buildings were erected. From Pyne's Royal Residences (1819).

The Wellington Fête was an entertainment held on 21 July 1814 at Carlton House, London, hosted by the Prince Regent in honour of the Duke of Wellington. The event marked the first use of a suite of temporary buildings erected in the palace gardens, including a polygon-shaped ballroom designed by John Nash which later became the Woolwich Rotunda.

== Background ==
The fête took place during a period of celebration following the abdication of Napoleon in April 1814 and the subsequent Treaty of Paris. Wellington had returned to England on 23 June after six years' continuous service in the Peninsular War, his first home leave since 1808. He had already been fêted at a masked ball at Burlington House on 1 July, a thanksgiving service at St Paul's Cathedral on 7 July, and a dinner at the Guildhall on 9 July. On 18 July the general officers and colonels of Wellington's regiments held a further ball in his honour at Burlington House.

The Prince Regent had hosted the Allied Sovereigns earlier that month, but the principal temporary buildings in the Carlton House gardens were not ready in time for their visit, which ended on 27 June. The Wellington Fête was thus the first occasion on which the full suite of structures was used.

== The temporary buildings ==
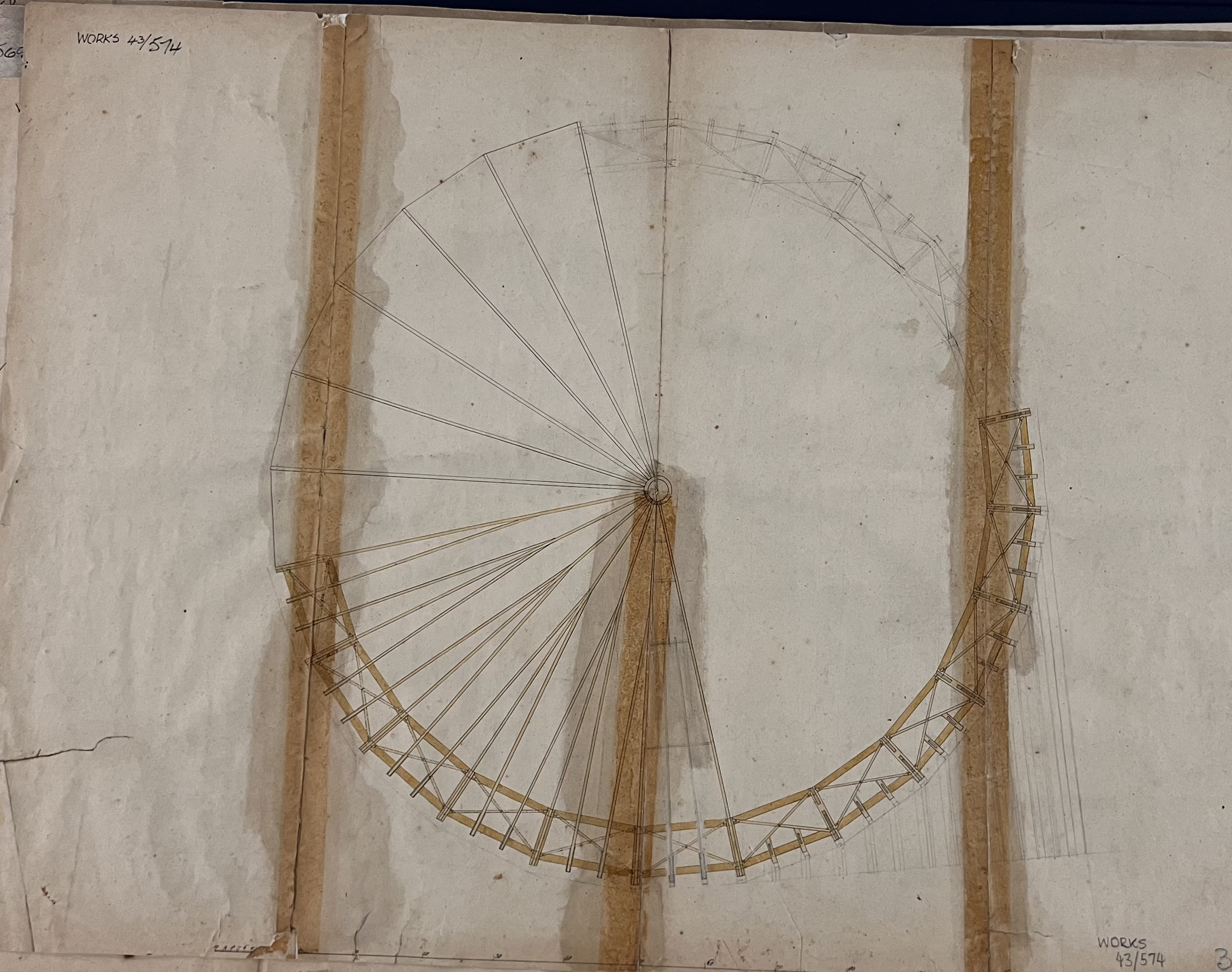
Ground plan of the polygon building at Carlton House, May 1814. The National Archives (WORK 43/573).

John Nash, the Prince Regent's favoured architect, designed the temporary structures, which were erected between May and July 1814. The principal building was a polygon structure of 24 sides in the form of a military bell tent, measuring approximately 116 feet in diameter and covering 10,600 square feet. It was variously called the "polygon building" or the "Rotunda" and served as a ballroom.

The roof was of painted oil cloth, supplied by James Baber's Patent Floor Cloth Manufactory. The exterior walls were decoratively boarded and likely painted with stripes. Inside, 24 timber posts with cast-iron cores ran around the building's inner edge, creating alcoves or recesses for seating. The roof was self-supporting, with no central column, and terminated in a louvred lantern for ventilation.

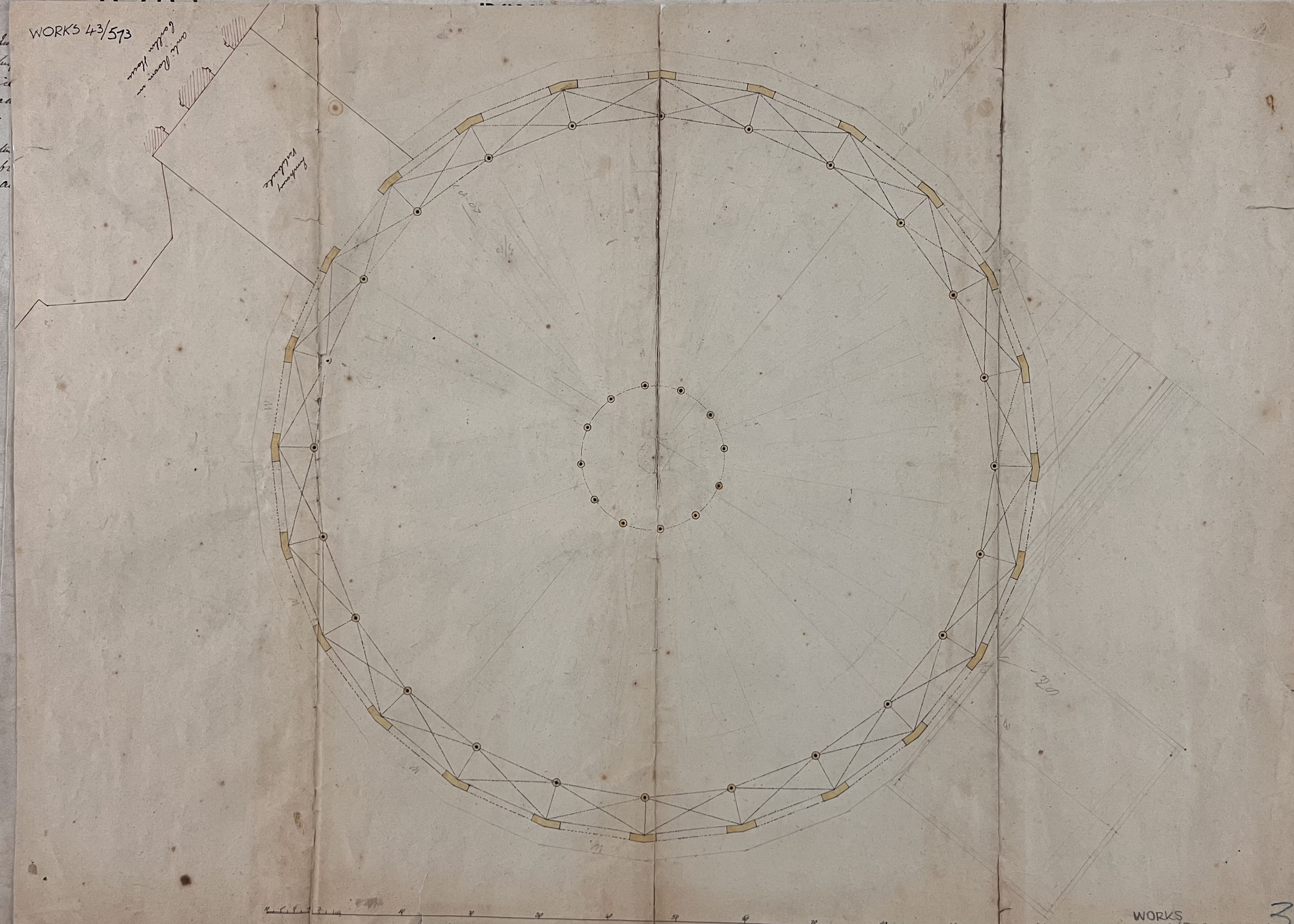
Plan of the roof timbers showing the 24 principal rafters. The National Archives (WORK 43/574).

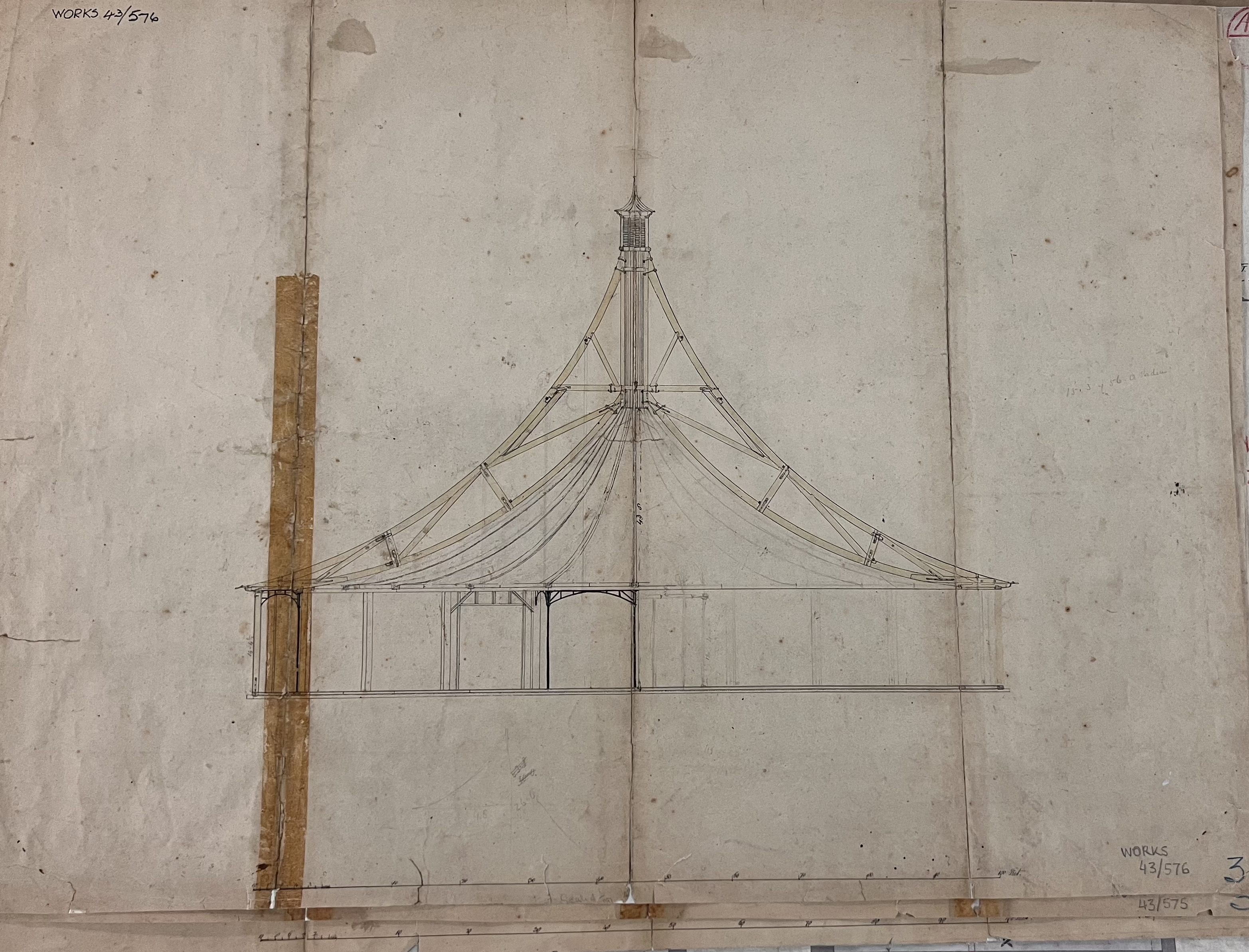
Section through the polygon building showing the self-supporting roof. The National Archives (WORK 43/576).

At the centre of the ballroom stood a temple formed by twelve posts, which housed the orchestra. The roof structure was executed under Nash's direction by William Nixon, who served as Clerk of the Works.

Attached to the Rotunda were further temporary buildings arranged in a cross formation: a refreshment room to the south, and two covered promenades extending east and west. At the end of the western promenade stood a Corinthian temple containing a marble bust of Wellington by Peter Turnerelli beneath a mirror surmounted by a star and the letter "W" in cut glass.

== The event ==
Around 2,500 guests were invited, including members of the royal family, foreign ambassadors, ministers, officers of state and members of the nobility. The number of military officers present, many having served under Wellington in the Peninsular War, gave the entertainment what the Annual Register described as "the appearance of a military fête". Wellington himself, watching his young aides-de-camp dancing, remarked to Lady Shelley: "How would society get on without all my boys!" The Queen stayed until half-past four, and many guests remained until dawn.

Guests arrived from nine o'clock, entering through the illuminated courtyard of Carlton House, passing through the Hall, Tribune and Grand Staircase, and descending to the basement level. The Prince Regent and other members of the royal family entered the ballroom via a temporary vestibule decorated with plate glass and white and rose-coloured draperies, which connected the polygon to the South Ante Room of the palace.

=== Decorations ===
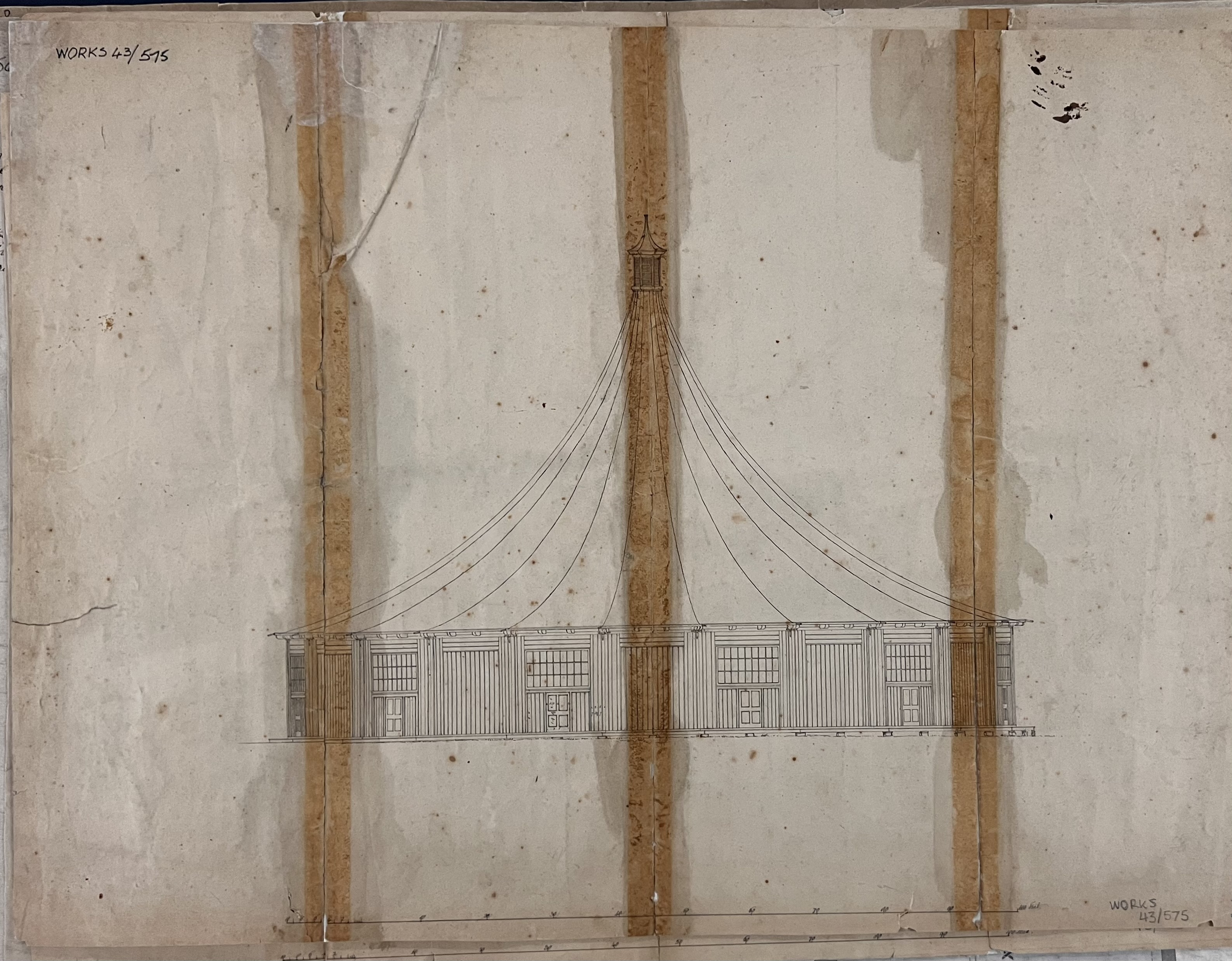
Elevation of the polygon building. The National Archives (WORK 43/575).

The inner canvas ceiling was painted to imitate white muslin and decorated with gilt cords. Each of the 24 recesses around the perimeter was hung with muslin draperies and fitted with eight plate-glass mirrors, the largest measuring 112 by 60 inches. The mirrors were hired from Ashlin & Collins.

The floor was divided into twelve compartments radiating from the central orchestra temple towards the recesses at the sides. These were chalked with devices for twelve sets of dancers by George Glover. The building was illuminated by twelve glass lustres with patent lamps, specially made by Parker & Perry. Twenty-four additional lamps "in form of Tent" continued the military theme.

The orchestra temple at the centre was decorated with artificial flowers, supplied by Francis Carbery, and connected to the roof by a gilt rope. The Queen and the Princesses sat on a sofa in the circular apartment.

=== Dress ===
The Prince Regent wore regimentals with his English, Russian, Prussian and French orders. The Duke of York and Wellington both wore the new Field Marshal's uniform, adorned with orders.

== Subsequent history ==
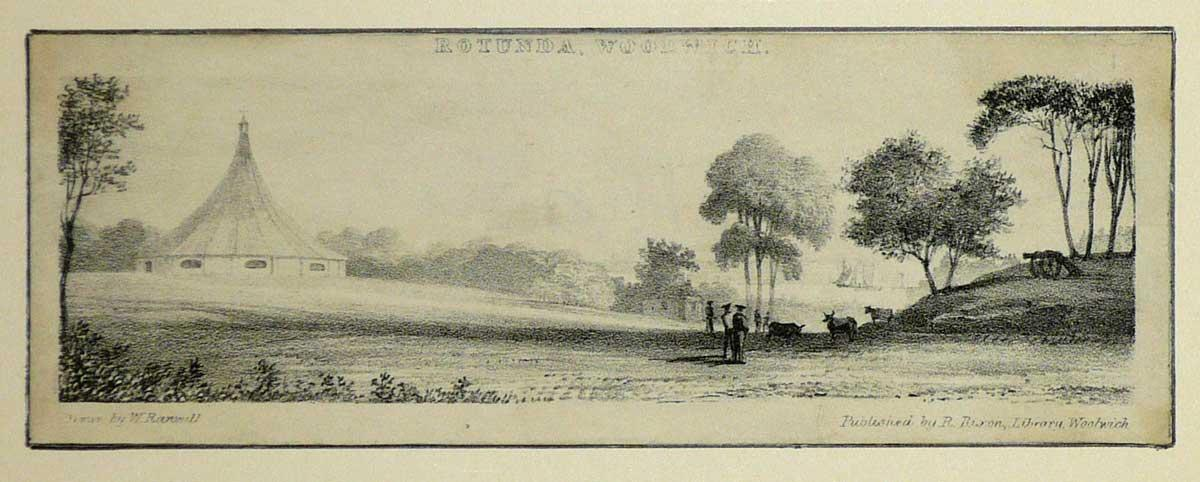
The Rotunda at Woolwich, c.1860. Drawing by William Ranwell.

The polygon building and the other temporary structures remained in the Carlton House gardens and were used again for the Grand Jubilee on 1 August 1814. They remained in place until 1818, when the Prince Regent ordered their removal. The polygon building was dismantled and re-erected on Woolwich Common for use as a museum by the Royal Artillery. When rebuilt at Woolwich in 1818–20, Nash converted it into a permanent structure with brick walls, a lead roof and a central sandstone column for additional support. It opened as a museum in mid-1820 and is now known as the Rotunda, Woolwich.

== See also ==
- Carlton House
- Grand Jubilee of 1814
- Rotunda, Woolwich

== Sources ==
- Cole, Emily; Skedd, Susan; Clarke, Jonathan; Newsome, Sarah (2020). The Rotunda (former Royal Artillery Museum), Woolwich Common, London Borough of Greenwich: History, Structure and Landscape (Report). Research Report Series. Historic England.
- Orme, Edward, ed. (1814). An Historical Memento. London.
