= Rotunda, Woolwich =

Grade II* listed building in London, England

The Rotunda
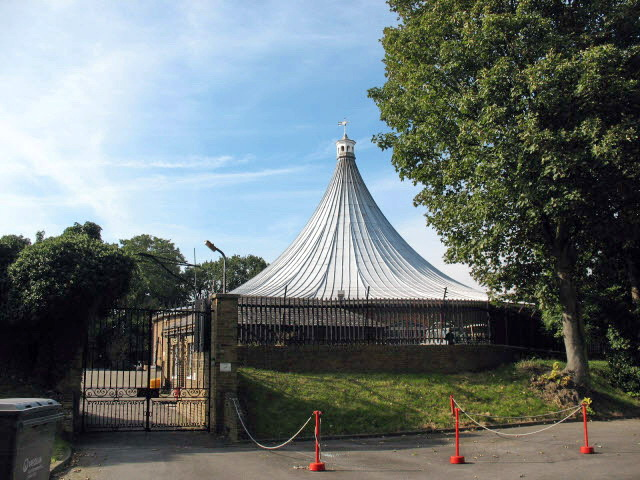
- The Rotunda entrance at Green Hill

- Shown in Greenwich
- 51.4842°N 0.0530°E
- Location: Woolwich

History
- Built: 1814

Site notes
- Architect: John Nash
- Architectural style: Neoclassical style

Listed Building – Grade II*
- Official name: The Rotunda (Royal Artillery Museum)
- Designated: 8 June 1973
- Reference no.: 1078987

The Rotunda on Woolwich Common, in south-east London, was originally a 24-sided wooden structure designed by the architect John Nash. Intended as a temporary building, it was erected on the grounds of Carlton House in 1814 for use as an additional reception room for the many events hosted there by the Prince Regent in celebration of the allied victory over Napoleon. The first event held in the structure was the Wellington Fête of 21 July 1814, a grand entertainment in honour of the Duke of Wellington. It is a Grade II* listed building.

== History ==
=== Carlton House (1814–1818) ===
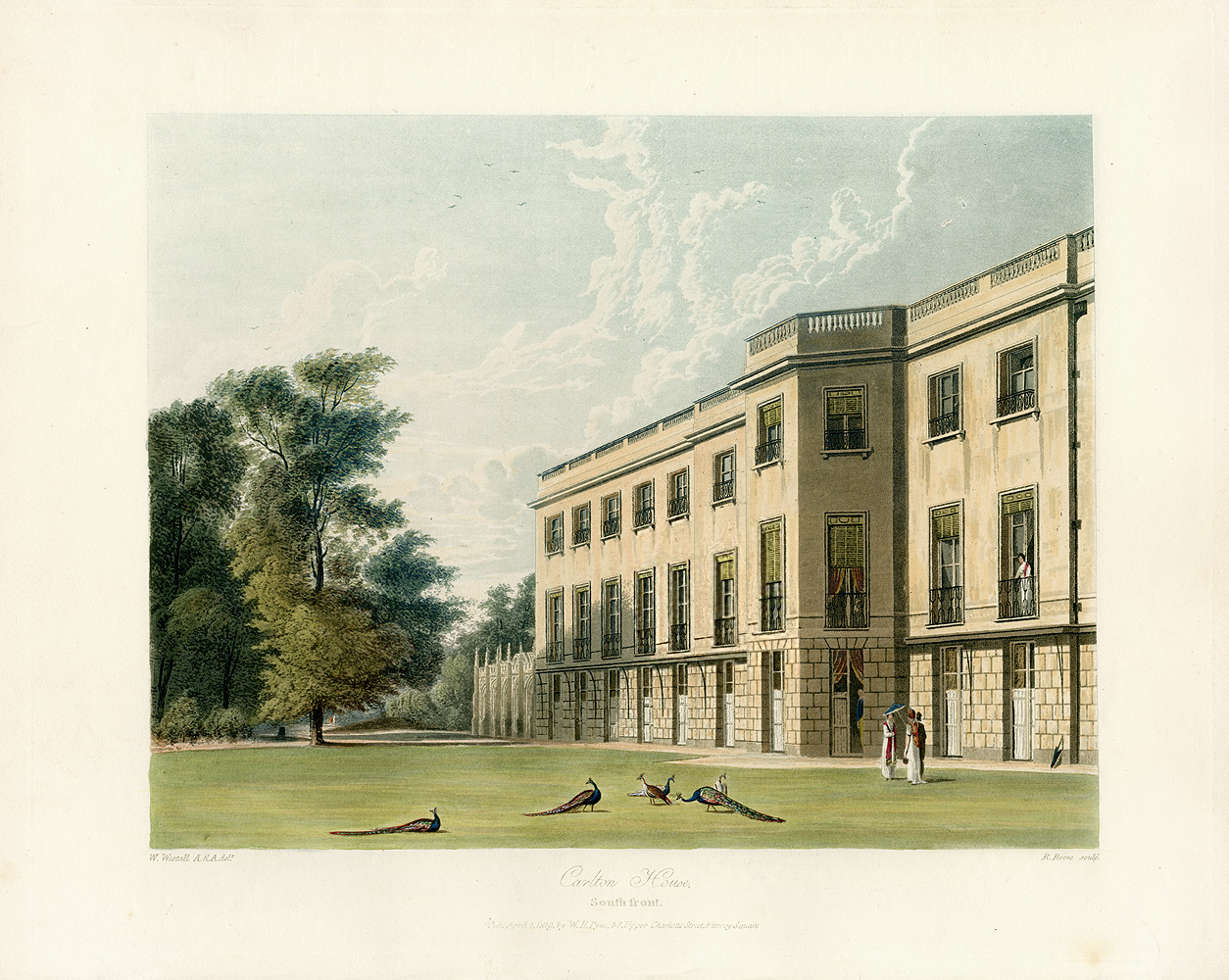
The garden front of Carlton House, where the temporary buildings were erected. From Pyne's Royal Residences (1819).

The building, commonly called the "polygon building" at the time, was designed as a temporary bell-tent-shaped ballroom. Nash and his assistant William Nixon erected the structure between May and July 1814 in the gardens of Carlton House. The first event held in it was the Wellington Fête of 21 July 1814, attended by over 2,000 guests, which inaugurated the building's use at Carlton House.

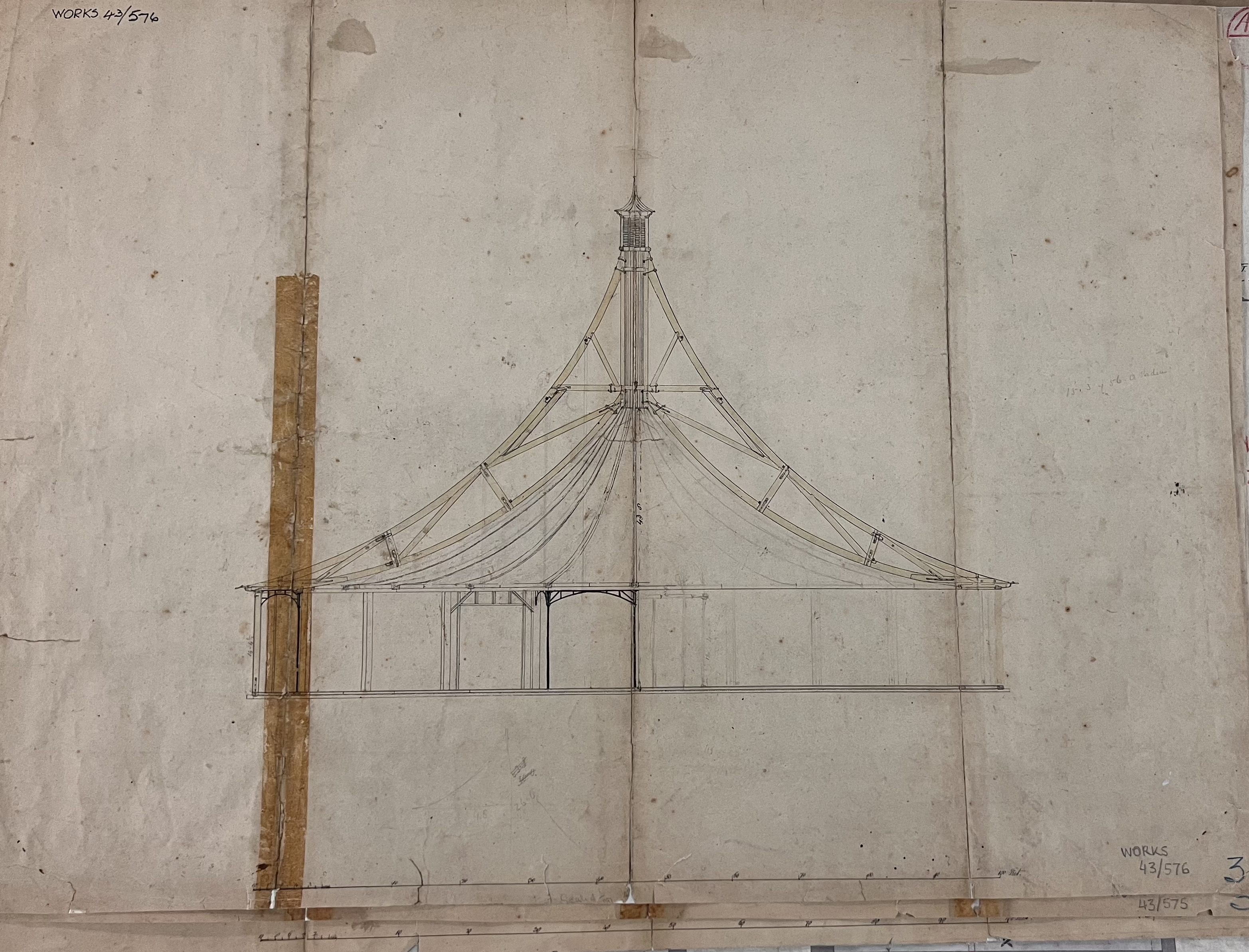
Section through the polygon building showing the self-supporting roof. The National Archives (WORK 43/576).

The structural system employed a self-supporting catenoidal roof with laminated timber construction and specialised iron connectors, a divided tie-beam truss system likely the first of its kind in Britain. The laminated members were formed from thin planks mechanically fastened with forged iron straps, bolts, and pegs; no glue was used, the technique predating industrialised glue-laminated timber by several decades. The radial arrangement of 24 principal rafters met at a central ring beam. The outward thrust at the base of the rafters was resolved by cross-bracing in the horizontal plane between the two concentric rings of 24 perimeter columns. Nash's drawings show these ties in cast iron; what was built, presumably by Nixon and Wyatt, was timber bracing. The result was a self-supporting roof that transferred only vertical load to the enclosing structure. One contemporary described it as "a very strong roof, independent of any central support." This structural approach would influence Nash's later work, notably the tented roofs of the Music and Banqueting Rooms at Brighton Pavilion, which employed similar laminated timber techniques. The question of attribution is not settled. T. F. Hunt, writing in 1830, stated that the roof "was designed or invented by, and executed under the direction of, the late William Nixon," suggesting the structural design may owe more to Nixon than to Nash.

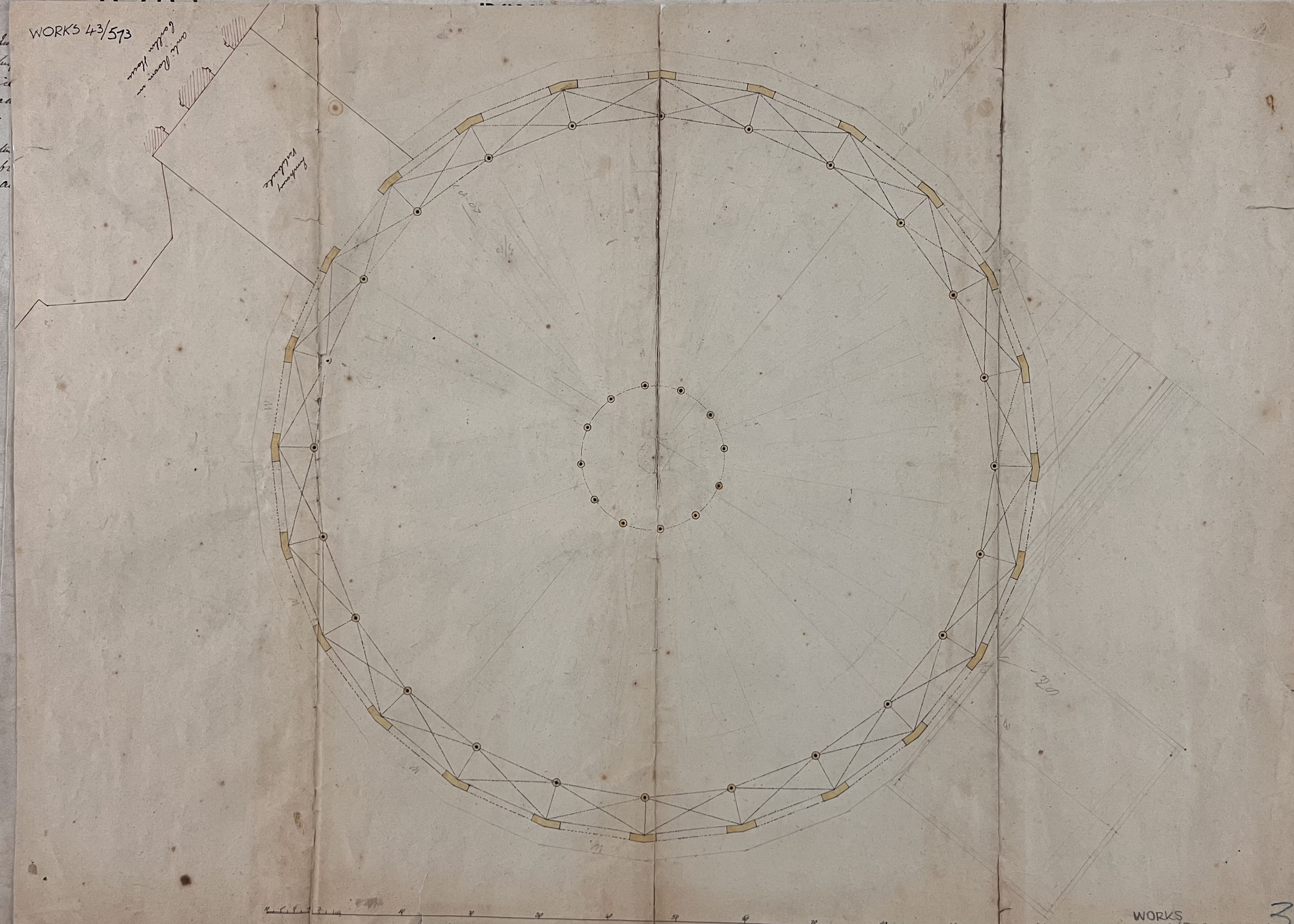
Plan of the roof timbers showing the 24 principal rafters. The National Archives (WORK 43/574).

The polygon building and the adjoining temporary structures remained in the Carlton House gardens after the Wellington Fête and were used again on 1 August 1814 for the Grand National Jubilee, a public celebration marking the centenary of the Hanoverian accession and the peace with France. William Congreve the younger, who had masterminded the Jubilee's firework displays and entertainments, would later secure the polygon building for the Royal Military Repository at Woolwich. The temporary buildings remained standing at Carlton House until 1818, when the Prince Regent ordered their removal.

=== Transfer to Woolwich (1818–1820) ===
John Nash initially hoped to convert the structure into a church, even preparing "a design and calculation" for this purpose, as the structure "was designed to house a large number of people, and was internally uninhibited by columns, so that sight and sound lines would have been excellent." However, the Prince Regent directed that it be re-erected on Woolwich Common for use as a museum by the Royal Artillery.

The transfer was facilitated by Benjamin Bloomfield, 1st Baron Bloomfield, the Prince Regent's Private Secretary and Keeper of the Privy Purse, with approval from Henry Phipps, 1st Earl of Mulgrave, the Master-General of the Ordnance. The reconstruction was supervised by Benjamin Charles Stephenson, Surveyor-General of the Office of Works, with Lt-Colonel John J. Jones of the Royal Engineers serving as Commanding Engineer.

The Rotunda's relocation to Woolwich was closely connected to the Royal Military Repository, which had been founded in 1778 by Captain William Congreve (1742–1814) of the Royal Artillery. Congreve created the Repository as "a school of methods of mounting and dismounting ordnance" after his experiences as a lieutenant firework in Canada during the Seven Years' War convinced him of the need to train the artillery to manoeuvre heavy ordnance in difficult conditions. Congreve conceived of forming "as extensive a collection as possible of everything tending to improve the science and practice of artillery, and to explain its progress."

After the elder Congreve's death in 1814, his son Sir William Congreve, 2nd Baronet (1772–1828) succeeded to all his father's appointments, including Commandant of the Royal Military Repository and Superintendent of Military Machines. The younger Congreve was instrumental in bringing the Rotunda to Woolwich, having been closely involved in the celebrations of 1814, including the Grand National Jubilee. When the Prince Regent decided to dismantle the Rotunda, the Historic England report notes that "Congreve's wish to obtain it must also have been considered something of an ideal arrangement by the Office of Works, in that it would save its staff the trouble of storing or selling the materials." On 7 December 1818, Congreve requested the building be erected "on the brow of the Hill at the eastern boundary of the Repository Grounds, that spot being the most convenient as well as the most picturesque situation for it."

When the building was re-erected in Woolwich (1819–1820), it underwent significant modifications to make it permanent. The original boarded outer walls were replaced with a solid brick drum approximately 660 mm thick, designed by Nash's assistant John Adey Repton, built in Flemish bond using London stock brick. The lower seven courses are of a harder-burned, darker brick forming a plinth to resist rising damp. Stone seats flanking the entrance doors create a wider foundation at the points of greatest structural opening. The original timber-encased cast-iron perimeter posts were built into the brickwork, and the timber cross-bracing between the column rings was retained. A central column of Doric form in freestone was inserted at the geometric centre. The solid drum added lateral restraint beyond what the original timber enclosure at Carlton House had provided. With the original perimeter bracing still in place, the column may have served principally as a precaution against failure of the iron rings at the king post rather than as the primary means of carrying the apex load.

=== Central column inscriptions ===
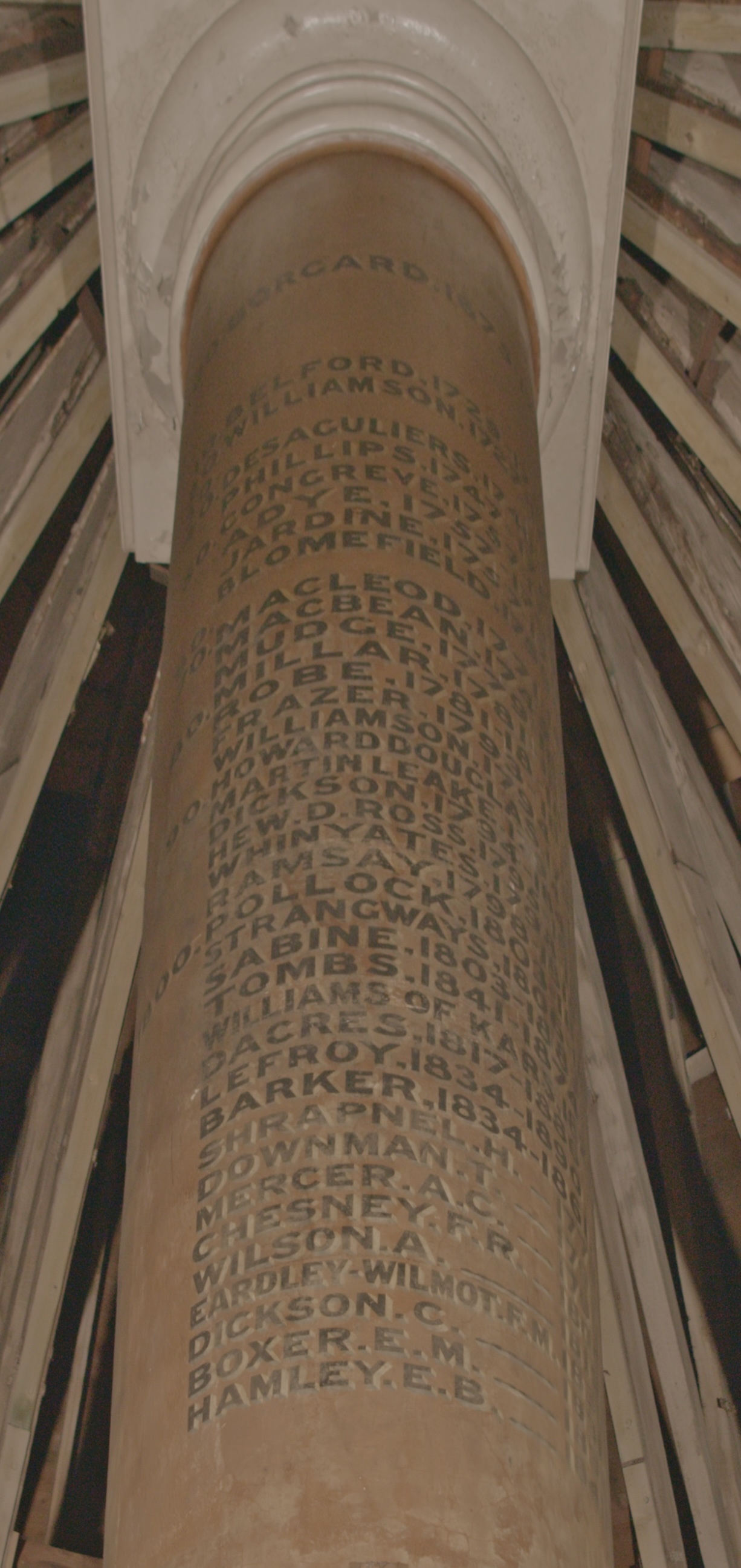
The central Doric column inside the Rotunda, Woolwich Common, London.

The freestone Doric column inserted at the geometric centre in 1819 bears the painted names of 39 officers of the Royal Artillery, arranged chronologically from the capital downward. The list begins with Colonel Albert Borgard (1659–1751), the regiment's first Colonel from 1722, and concludes with General Sir Edward Bruce Hamley (1824–1893). The names span the regiment's first 170 years and include figures from several fields: combat commanders such as Colonel Sir Augustus Simon Frazer, who led the Royal Horse Artillery at Waterloo; scientists and explorers such as General Sir Edward Sabine FRS, President of the Royal Society, and General Sir John Henry Lefroy FRS, who conducted the magnetic survey of British North America; inventors such as Captain William Congreve the elder, who founded the Royal Military Repository at Woolwich in 1778; and two recipients of the Victoria Cross, Major General Sir Henry Tombs VC and Colonel Sir Collingwood Dickson VC.

The inscriptions appear on one face of the column, oriented toward the main entrance. The last legible names date from the 1890s, when the Royal Military Repository closed at Woolwich. The Repository had been the Rotunda's parent institution since the building's transfer to Woolwich; after it closed, there was no longer a commandant to authorise additions. Three consecutive names, Sabine, Lefroy, and Eardley-Wilmot, were colleagues in the global terrestrial magnetism survey programme based from 1839 at the nearby Royal Artillery Institution Observatory on Green Hill, within sight of the Rotunda. The King's Troop, Royal Horse Artillery, the direct descendant of the regiment whose officers are commemorated on the column, remains based at Napier Lines adjacent to the Rotunda site.

=== Museum use (1820–2001) ===
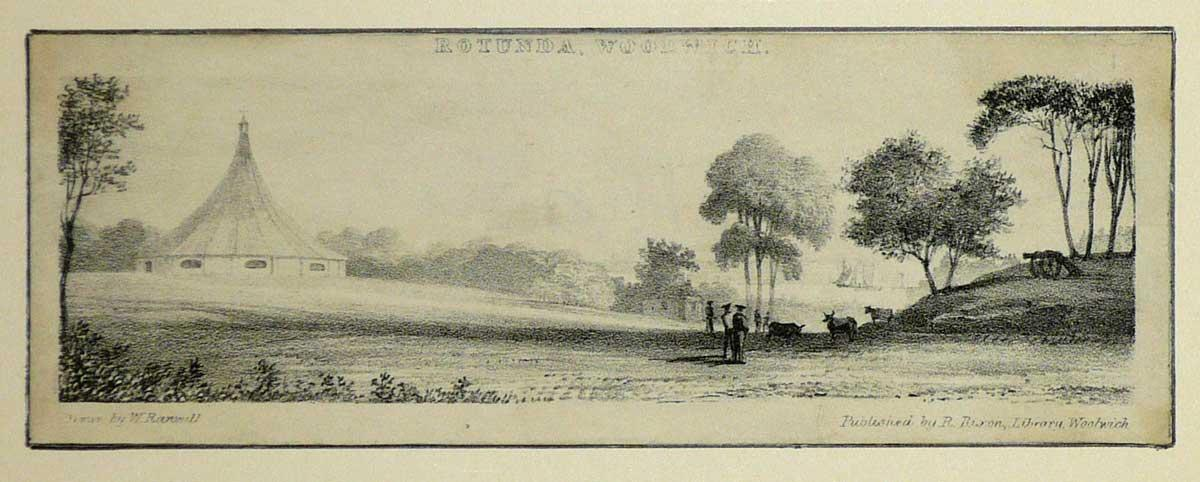
The Rotunda at Woolwich, c.1860. Drawing by William Ranwell.

When it opened as a museum in 1820, one of the earliest of its kind in the world, the younger Congreve set out its aims as providing "practical instruction for the Officers, Non-commissioned Officers, and Men of the Regiment of Artillery, both on the great scale and with the aid of Drawings and Models." Congreve added his own model of St James's Park and Carlton House Gardens during the 1814 celebrations (showing the Rotunda in its original position) to the museum's collection, though this model is now seemingly lost. He also contributed his celebrated rockets and other inventions.

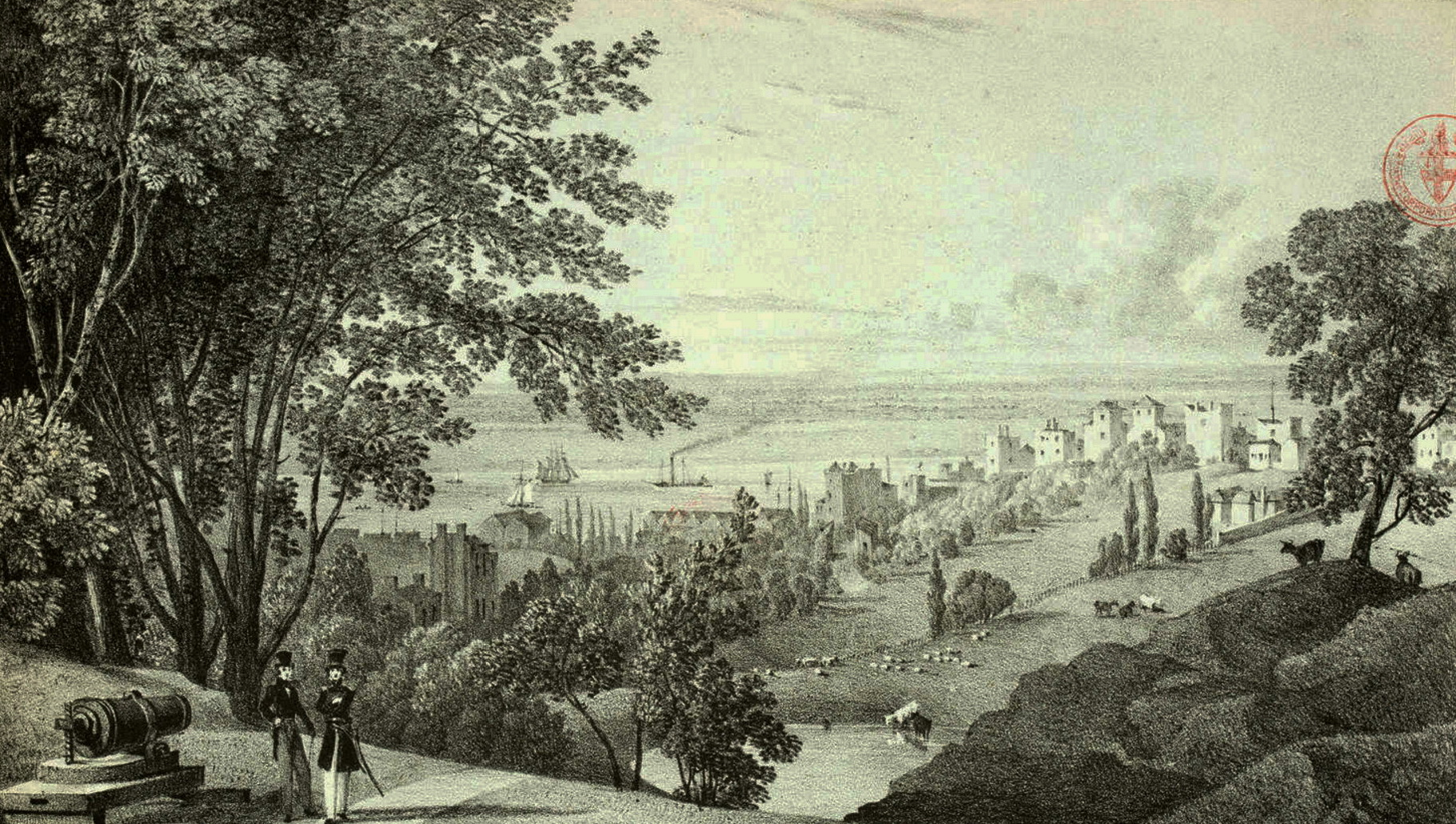
View of Woolwich from the Rotunda, T. M. Baynes, 1823. London Metropolitan Archives.

Between 1861 and 1864, under General Sir John Henry Lefroy, the canvas covering was replaced with lead. The original canvas and weatherboards imposed approximately 5–10 kg/m^{2} on the roof structure; lead with sarking and accumulated repairs is likely to be 40–55 kg/m^{2}. Unlike canvas, which had allowed moisture in the laminated timber to dissipate through seasonal variation, the lead formed an impermeable layer over the sarking boards. A plan, section, and elevation dated 3 February 1861 (The National Archives, WORK 43/577) records this phase, including a single-storey north extension and four rooflights in the new lead covering.

A major restoration was carried out between 1972 and 1975 by Messrs Dove Brothers under the direction of the Property Services Agency. What began as a routine maintenance contract revealed structural decay more extensive than anticipated. The original timber-encased cast-iron wall posts were replaced with reinforced concrete poured into the voids within the solid brickwork. A concrete floor slab was laid throughout in place of the original timber floor. The canvas ceiling was replaced with a replica in panels. The exterior lead was stripped and re-laid. A timber inspection walkway was installed above the new ceiling for maintenance access. Specialists from the Princes Risborough laboratory found the laminated timber trusses in reasonable condition and most were repaired in place. The restoration received a European Architectural Heritage Year award in 1975. Cole, Newsome, and McCaig note that the timber and cast-iron wall structure removed by Dove Brothers was almost certainly original to Nash's 1814 construction.

In 1973 the Rotunda was designated as a Grade II* listed building.

The Rotunda was used as the Royal Artillery Museum until 1999, when it closed to the public. The building continued to house the museum's reserve collection until 2010. In 2001, a new museum branded as "Firepower: The Royal Artillery Museum" opened at the nearby Royal Arsenal, bringing together the collections from the Rotunda with the regimental history collection. All Firepower's buildings were once part of the Royal Laboratory Department, which controlled the manufacture of ammunition; they are for the most part Grade II listed. Firepower closed in July 2016. Following the 2016 closure, the collection was moved to Larkhill in Wiltshire.

=== Decline and vacancy (2001–2024) ===
The Rotunda has not been in regular use since 2001. After the collections moved to Firepower, the building served as the museum's reserve store until approximately 2010, and was then used for a period as a boxing gym by the King's Troop, Royal Horse Artillery at neighbouring Napier Lines. It has had no sustained occupied use since approximately 2010. Without heating or ventilation, water ingress through the deteriorating lead roof caused progressive decay in the laminated timber rafters. The building has been on Historic England's Heritage at Risk list since 2007, classified as Priority A: immediate risk of further rapid deterioration or loss of fabric, no solution agreed.

In autumn 2023, emergency stabilisation works were carried out under conservation oversight by Crosby Granger Architects. The 1974 replica canvas ceiling was stripped to allow inspection of the roof structure, and scaffold propping was installed to eight trusses showing structural defects. Truss 21 had suffered a failure of its bottom chord, the tension member that restrains the rafter foot from spreading, causing significant deflection of the roof and lead covering above. A ninth truss received further propping in winter 2024–25 following a detailed structural appraisal from a boom-lift platform. Nine of the twenty-four trusses are currently propped. Electrics have been untested since 2009 and heating systems are non-functional. A 2020 repair estimate exceeded £2.6 million; by 2025 total repair costs were estimated at £3 million.

In November 2023, the adjacent Repository Woods were included on a Historic England list of ten London sites designated as 'at-risk'. In 2023 the owners, the Defence Infrastructure Organisation, were given permission to undertake limited repairs to the listed building to address problems caused by the roof leaking over several years.

=== Sale (2025–present) ===
In 2020, the Ministry of Defence announced plans to sell much of the Woolwich Barracks site, with a target departure date of 2028, though the King's Troop, Royal Horse Artillery would remain at Napier Lines.

In February 2025, the Royal Borough of Greenwich launched a public consultation on the future of the barracks site, which closed on 17 March 2025. The consultation identified the Rotunda as being of "exceptional historical and architectural significance" whilst noting its poor condition. In October 2025, the council published a draft Supplementary Planning Document (SPD) setting out guidance for the redevelopment of the barracks site, proposing up to 1,920 new homes alongside commercial and community space, with heritage buildings to be retained and integrated.

In early 2026, the Rotunda and its 1.65 acres (0.7 ha) curtilage were put on the market by Avison Young on behalf of the Defence Infrastructure Organisation through an informal tender process. The site extends to 10,922 square feet of internal space, with several ancillary buildings including a curator's office and a tractor shed. It is classified as Metropolitan Open Land, affording it Green Belt-equivalent protection under the London Plan and limiting development potential to the existing building and its immediate surroundings. A condition survey by Crosby Granger Architects, updated in January 2025, estimated total repair costs at approximately £3 million.

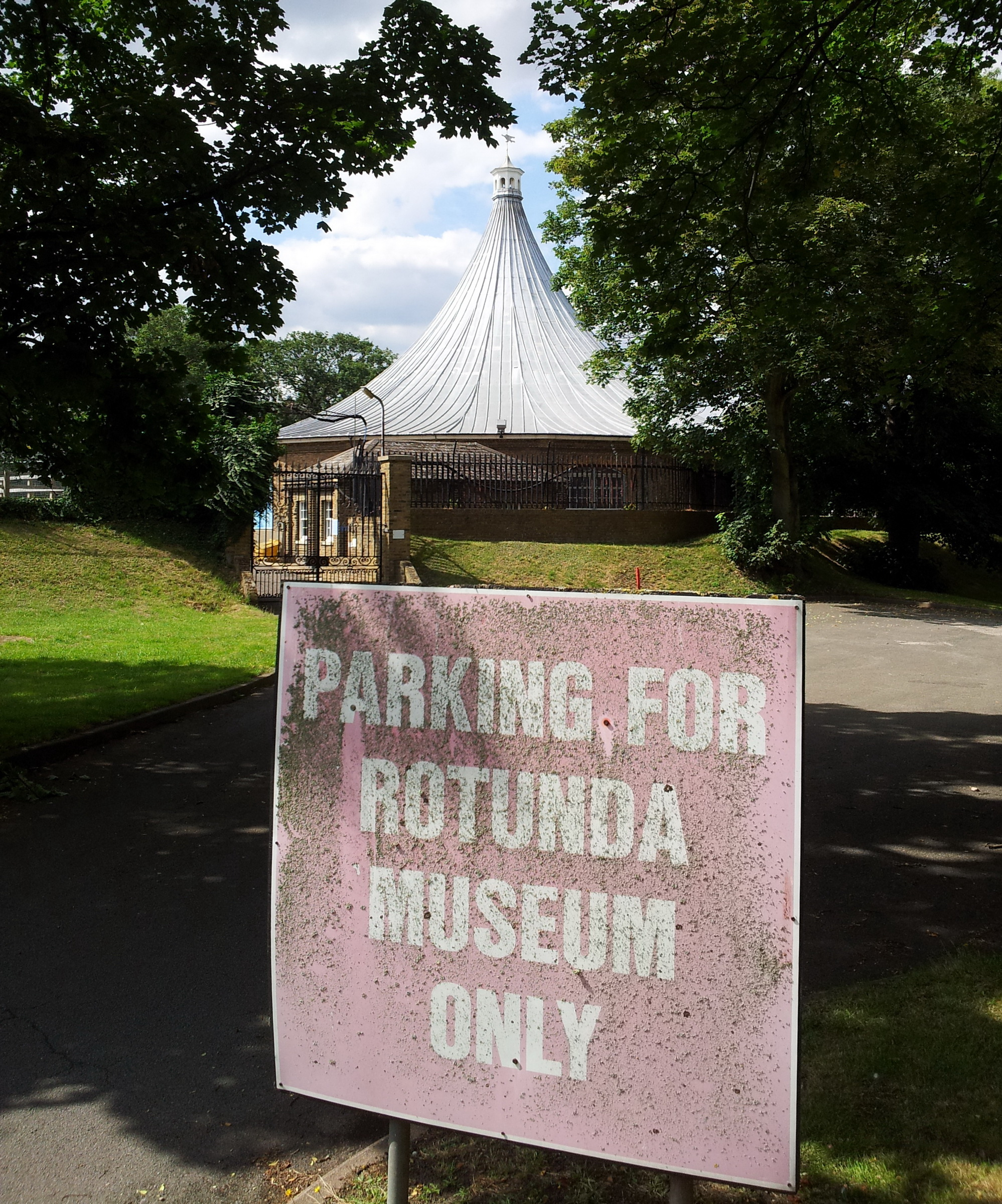
Obsolete sign near the entrance

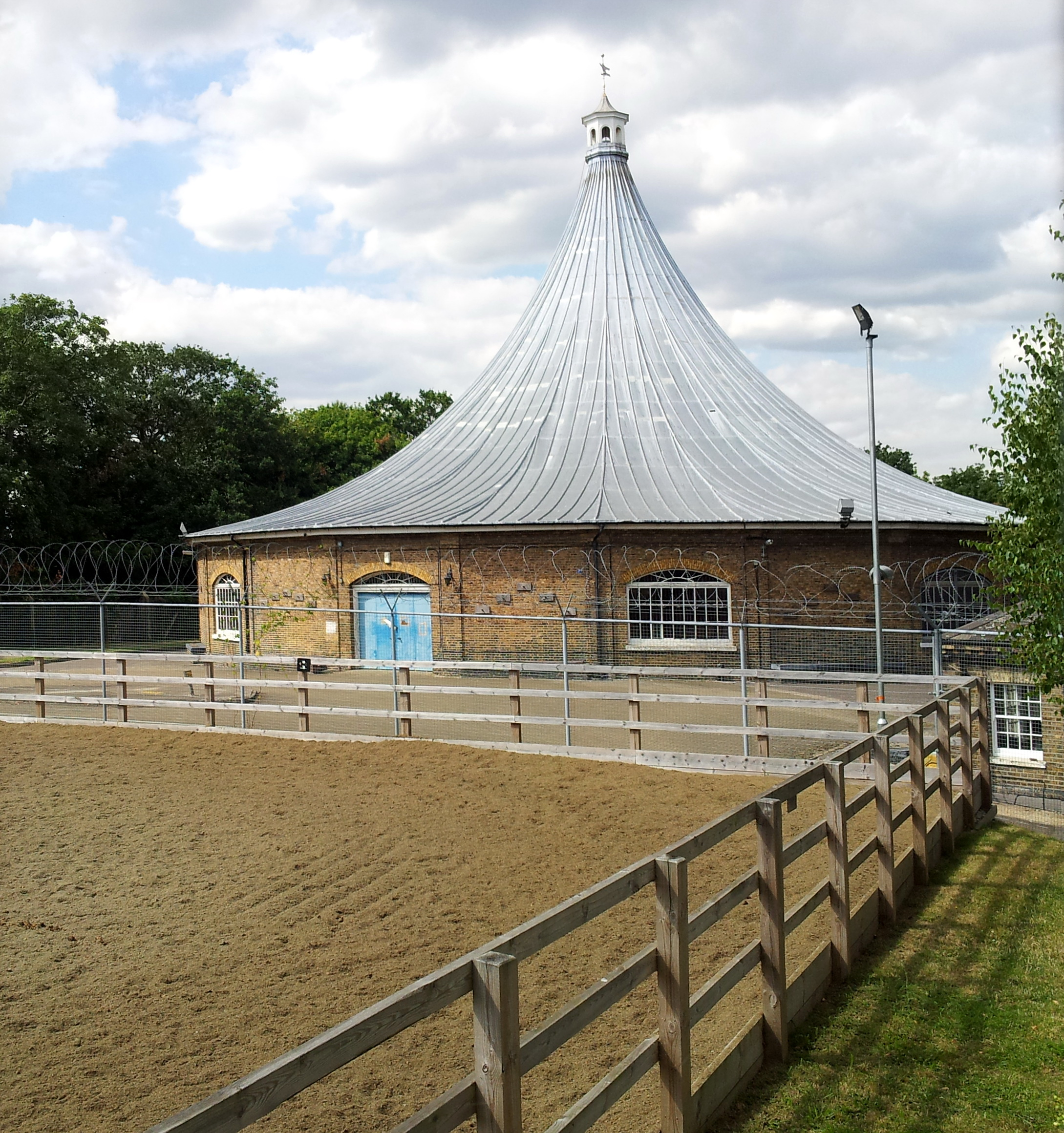
Rotunda and Napier Lines corral

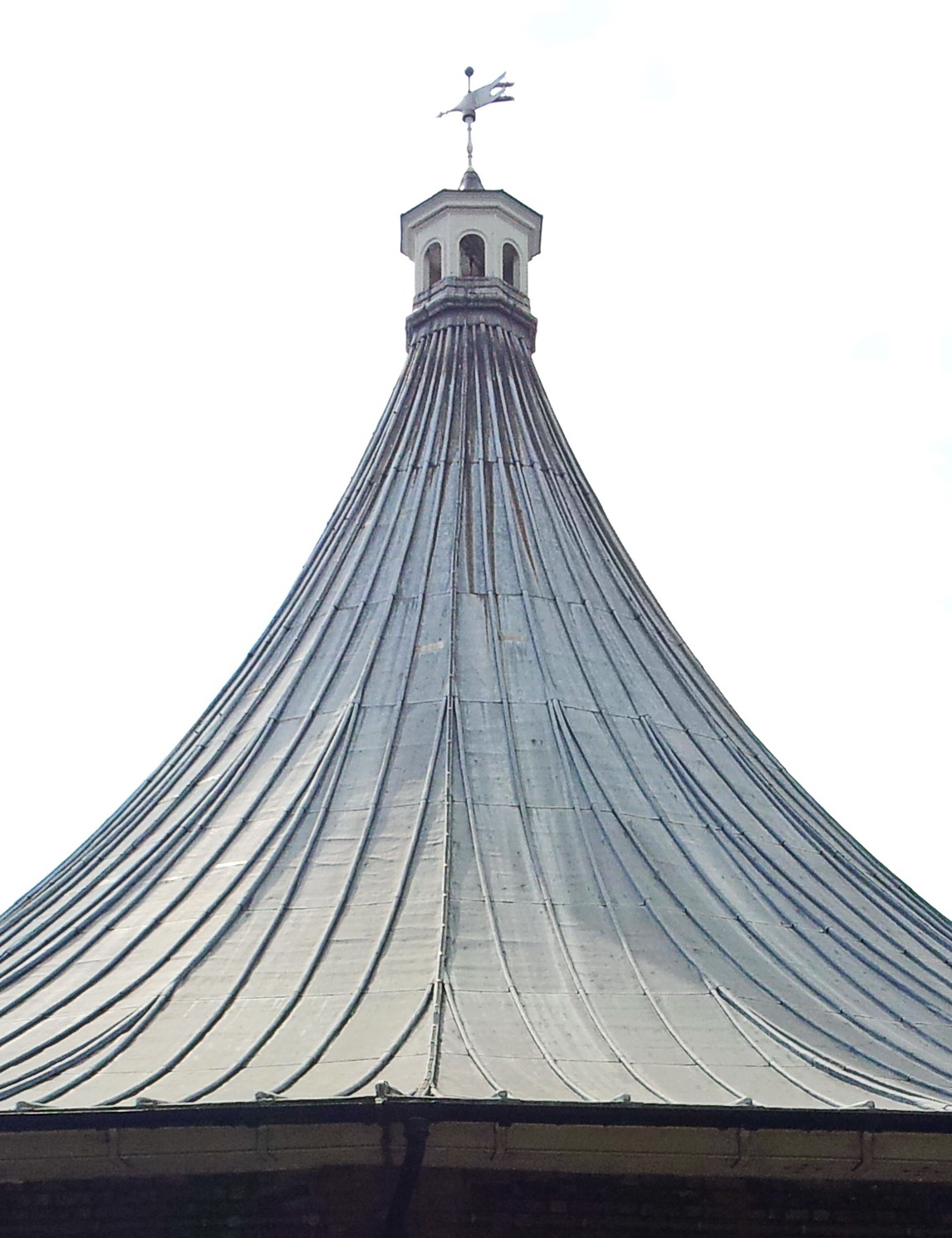
Tent-roof detail

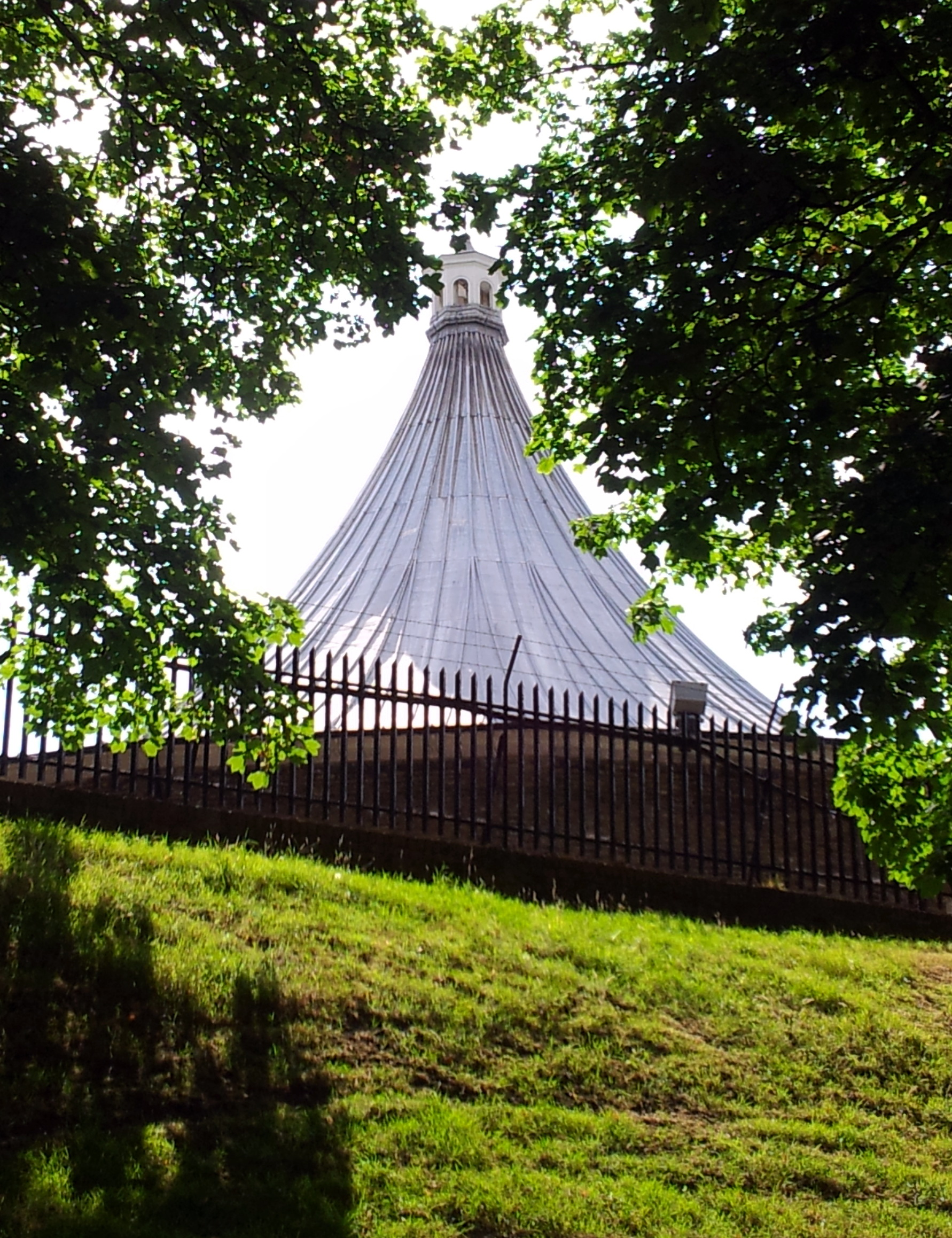
View from the east

== See also ==
- Carlton House
- Wellington Fête 1814
- Grand Jubilee of 1814
- Royal Artillery Museum
- Royal Arsenal
- Repository Woods
- Woolwich Garrison

== Bibliography ==
- Clarke, Jonathan (2005). "Cones, Not Domes: The Woolwich Rotunda and Structural Innovation in Regency Architecture". Construction History. 21: 3–24.
- Clarke, Jonathan; Cole, Emily; Newsome, Sarah; Skedd, Susan (2020). The Rotunda (Former Royal Artillery Museum), Woolwich Common, London Borough of Greenwich: History, Structure and Landscape. Historic England Research Report Series, 251/2020.
- Cole, Emily; Skedd, Susan; Newsome, Sarah; McCaig, Verena (2025). The Woolwich Rotunda. Liverpool University Press. ISBN 978-1-83624-459-2.
- Congreve, William (1822). Detail of the Different Models, Arms, Trophies and Military Machines of every description contained in the Rotunda and the Grounds of the Royal Military Repository at Woolwich. London.
