= Carlton House =

Former mansion in Westminster

Coordinates: 51°30′22″N 00°07′54″W

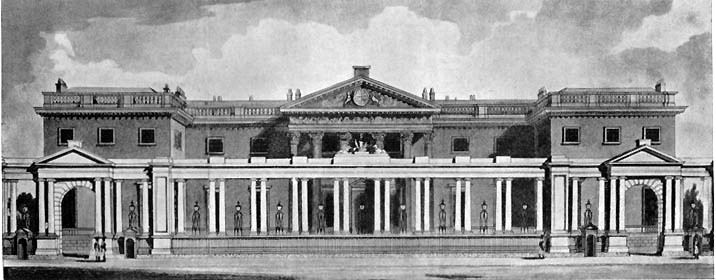

- Location within Central London

General information
- Architectural style: Georgian Neoclassical
- Location: Westminster, London, United Kingdom

Carlton House, sometimes Carlton Palace, was a mansion in Westminster, best known as the town residence of George IV, during the regency era and his time as prince regent, before he took the throne as king. It faced the south side of Pall Mall, and its gardens abutted St James's Park (Note: Years later The Mall was driven through the former gardens, to provide a ceremonial route between Buckingham Palace and Admiralty Arch, which now leads into Trafalgar Square.) in the St James's district of London. The location of the house, now replaced by Carlton House Terrace, was a main reason for the creation of John Nash's ceremonial route from St James's to Regent's Park via Regent Street, Portland Place and Park Square: Lower Regent Street and Waterloo Place were originally laid out to form the approach to its front entrance.

== History ==
An existing house was rebuilt in 1709 for Henry Boyle, created Baron Carleton in 1714, who bequeathed it to his nephew, the architect Richard Boyle, 3rd Earl of Burlington. (Note: Burlington employed Henry Flitcroft to unify the garden front and reface it in stone (Stroud 1966, p. 61).) Burlington sold it in 1732 to Frederick, Prince of Wales, for whom William Kent laid out the garden. Frederick's widow Augusta, Princess of Wales, enlarged the house. (Note: The neighbouring structure had been the London house of the Prince's friend George Bubb Doddington, Lord Melcombe.)

In 1783, Frederick's grandson George, Prince of Wales, was granted possession of Carlton House and £60,000 (equivalent to £7.8 million in 2025) to refurbish it. The Prince had the house substantially rebuilt by the architect Henry Holland between 1783 and 1796. By the time the Prince of Wales and Henry Holland parted company in 1802, Carlton House was a spacious and opulent residence, which would have been designated a palace in many countries. From the 1780s it was the centre of a glittering alternative court to that of the Prince's parents at St James's and Buckingham House. After he became Prince Regent the house was altered and redecorated to suit its increasing use as a palace in all but name. On 19 June 1811 the Regent hosted a grand reception ostensibly to honour Louis XVIII and the exiled French royal family, but largely to celebrate the establishment of his own regency.

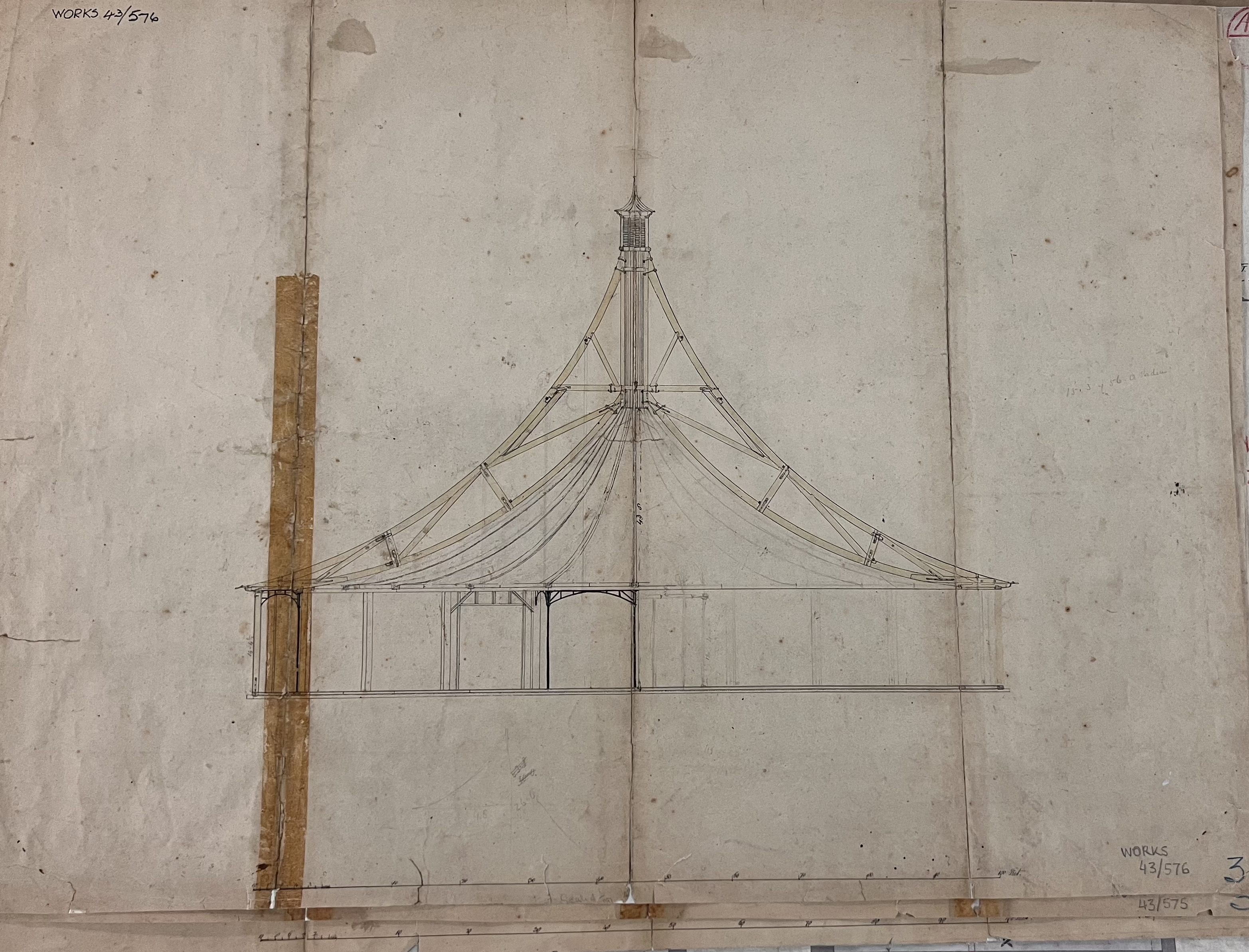
Section through Nash's polygon building for the 1814 celebrations, showing the self-supporting roof. The National Archives (WORK 43/576).

The summer of 1814 saw Carlton House at the centre of celebrations marking the allied victory over Napoleon. In June, the Regent entertained the Allied Sovereigns including Tsar Alexander I and King Frederick William III of Prussia. For these occasions, John Nash erected temporary structures in the gardens, including a large polygonal ballroom known as the "tent room", which employed innovative laminated timber construction. The principal occasion was the Wellington Fête on 21 July honouring the Duke of Wellington, attended by some 2,000 guests. The gardens were used again on 1 August for the Grand Jubilee of 1814. After the celebrations ended, Nash's polygon room was dismantled in 1818 and re-erected on Woolwich Common as a museum for the Royal Artillery; it survives today as the Rotunda, Woolwich.

One of the most splendid apartments in the palace was the crimson drawing-room, in which Princess Charlotte was married, in 1816, to Prince Leopold of Saxe-Coburg.

In 1820, on the death of his father, George III, the Prince Regent became King George IV. The first proclamation of the accession was made on the steps of Carlton House.

George IV deemed that Carlton House, the official royal residence of St. James's Palace, and his parents' Buckingham House were all inadequate for his needs. Some consideration was given to rebuilding Carlton House on a far larger scale, but in the end Buckingham House was rebuilt as Buckingham Palace instead. Carlton House was demolished in 1826 and replaced with two grand white stuccoed terraces of expensive houses known as Carlton House Terrace. The proceeds of the leases were put towards the cost of Buckingham Palace.

== Architecture ==
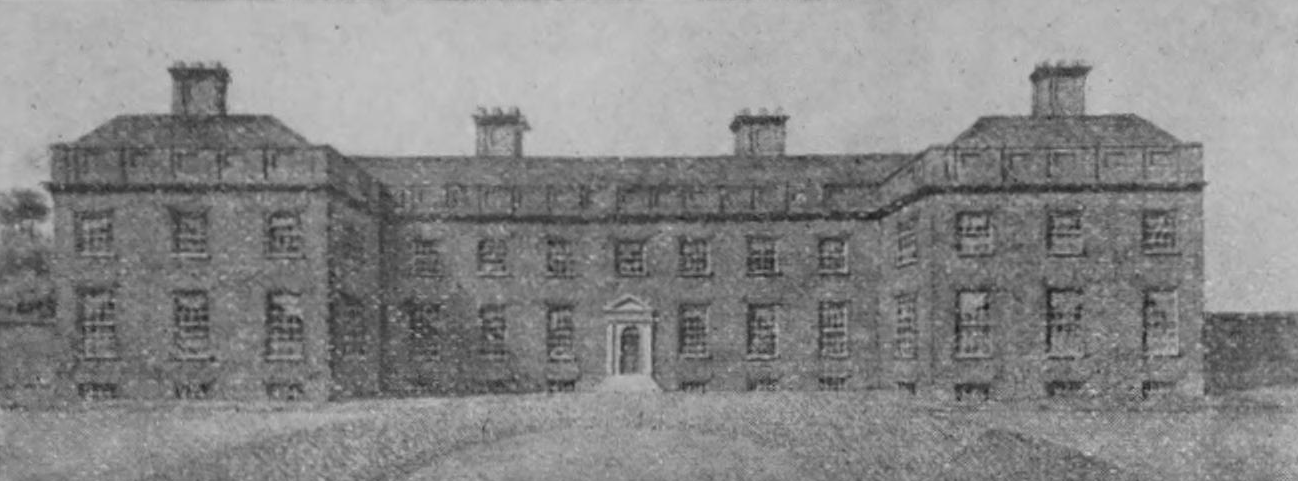
The house before its alterations

When the Prince of Wales took possession in August 1783, Sir William Chambers was appointed as architect, but after a first survey, he was quickly replaced by Henry Holland. Both Chambers and Holland were proponents of the French neoclassical style of architecture, and Carlton House would be extremely influential in introducing the Louis XVI style to England.

Holland began working first on the State Apartments along the garden front, the principal reception rooms of the house. Construction commenced in 1784; when these rooms were visited in September 1785 by the usually critical Horace Walpole, he was impressed, writing that when completed, Carlton House would be "the most perfect in Europe".

There is an august simplicity that astonished me. You cannot call it magnificent; it is the taste and propriety that strike. Every ornament is at a proper distance, and not one too large, but all delicate and new, with more freedom and variety than Greek ornaments; and, though probably borrowed from the Hotel de Condé and other new Palaces, not one that is not rather classic than French.

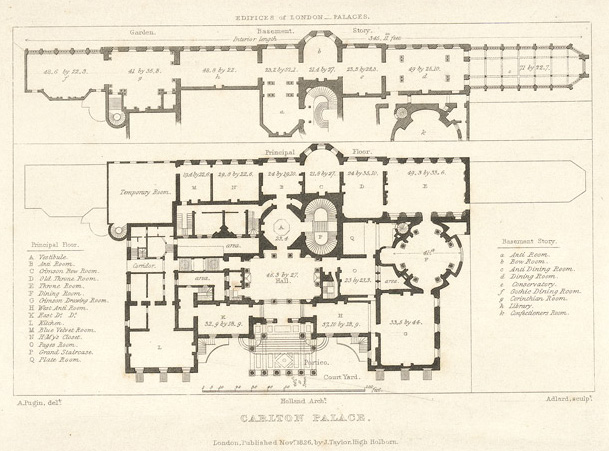
Plan showing the main floor and the suite of reception rooms on the lower ground floor

The chimney-pieces were added 1783 to 1785 by the London sculptor Thomas Carter the Younger.

Construction at Carlton House came to a halt at the end of 1785 due to the Prince of Wales's mounting debts. His unpaid bills, following his secret morganatic marriage to Maria Fitzherbert amounted to £250,000. Parliament appointed a commission to investigate the huge cost overruns at Carlton House, and to draw up estimates on how much would be needed to complete the project. In May 1787, the Prince of Wales contritely approached his father, King George III, and persuaded him to provide the money to finish the house. When work resumed in the summer of 1787, with a budget of £60,000, it was with the assistance of many of France's leading furniture makers and craftsmen, under the design supervision of the Parisian marchand-mercier Dominique Daguerre, Marie Antoinette's former interior decorator, who acted as the agent through whom furniture by Adam Weisweiler was imported.

A stained glass window was supplied by William Raphael Eginton. Circa 1816, he described it thus:

Large Window at the end of the Conservatory, in which are executed the Arms of his Royal Highness the Prince Regent, with Supporters, 4 Feet high, Crests, Mantles, &c. &c. enclosed in a rich Border of Arms; being a series from Edward Prince of Wales to the present time; and on the side Windows the Badges of all the Kings of England and Princes of Wales, 32 in number, with the German Arms of their Royal Highnesses the Dukes of York, Clarence, Kent, Cumberland, Sussex, and Cambridge.

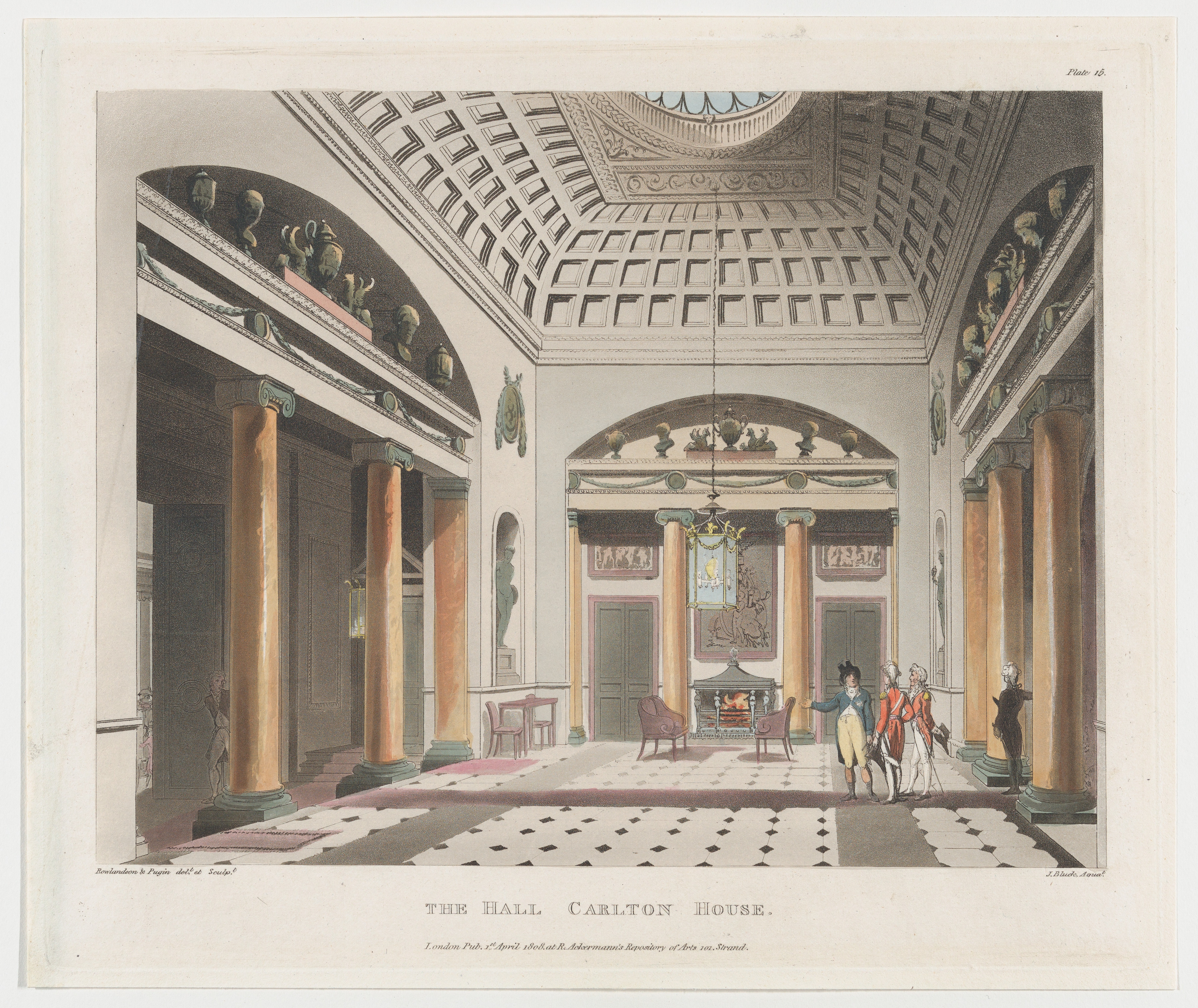
The Hall of Carlton House

When completed, Carlton House was approximately 202 feet (62 m) long, and 130 feet (40 m) deep. Visitors entered through a hexastyle portico of Corinthian columns, which led to a foyer that was flanked on either side by anterooms. The building was unusual in that visitors entered on the main floor, in contrast to most London mansions and palaces of the time, which followed the Palladian architectural concept of a low ground floor (or rustic) with the principal floor above.

From the foyer, visitors would enter the two-story top-lit entrance hall, decorated with Ionic columns of yellow marble scagliola. Beyond the hall was an octagonal room that was also top lit. The octagonal room was flanked on the right by the grand staircase and flanked on the left by a courtyard, while straight ahead was the main anteroom. Once in the anteroom, visitors could turn left into the private apartments of the Prince of Wales, or right into the formal reception rooms: Throne Room, drawing room, music room and dining room.

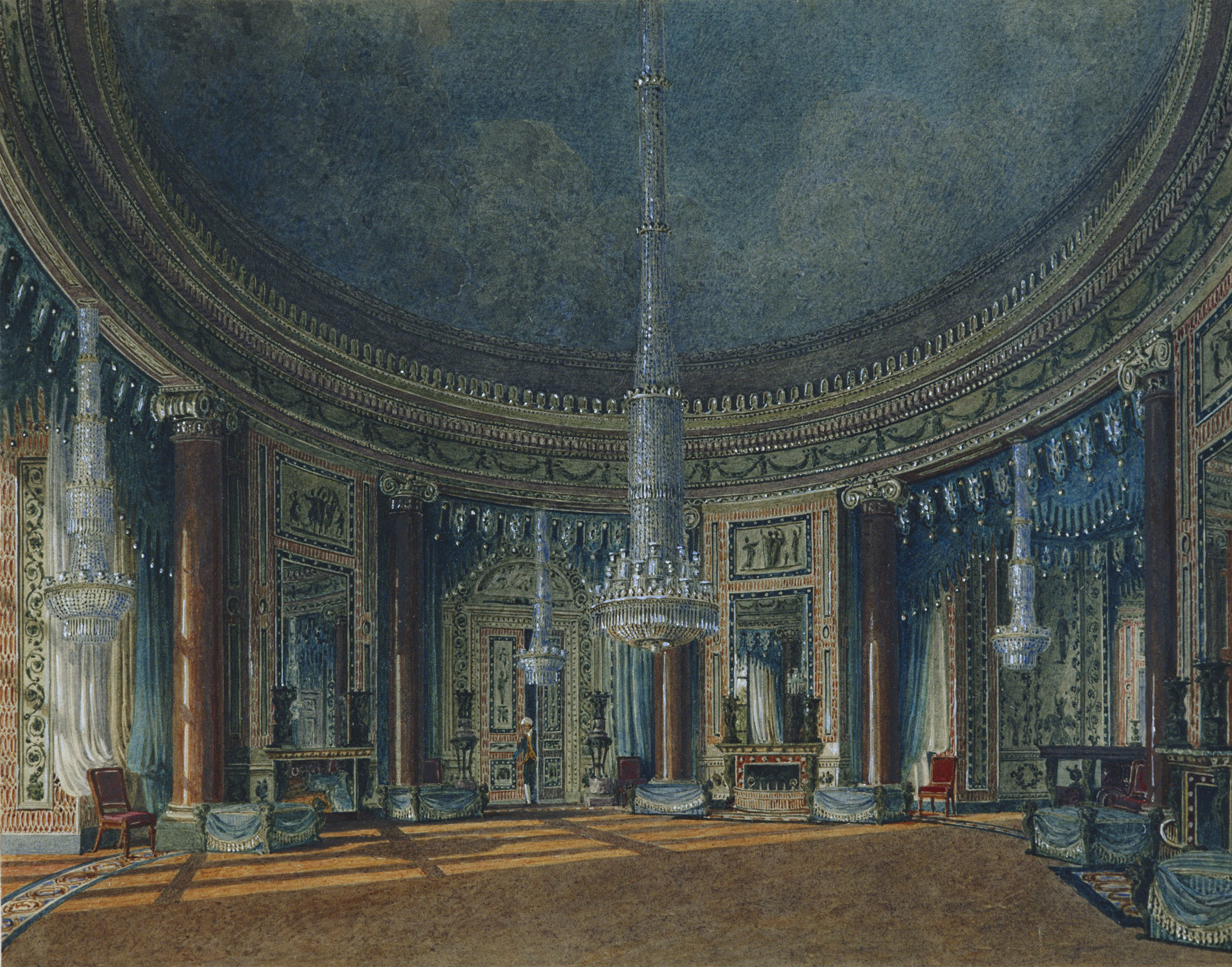
Carlton House, Circular Room

The lower ground floor comprised a suite of low-ceilinged rooms, including a gothic dining room, a library for the Prince, a Chinese drawing room, and a perpendicular gothic conservatory constructed of cast iron and stained glass. This suite of rooms was equipped with folding doors which when opened created an enfilade of eight rooms terminating in the conservatory allowing, on one occasion, the entire length to be set out as a single banqueting table. The ground floor rooms gave directly onto the garden facing the Mall, which had a landscaping scheme by the fashionable designer Humphry Repton. An earlier garden design by William Kent had been undertaken for the Prince's grandmother Princess Augusta but had been swept away.

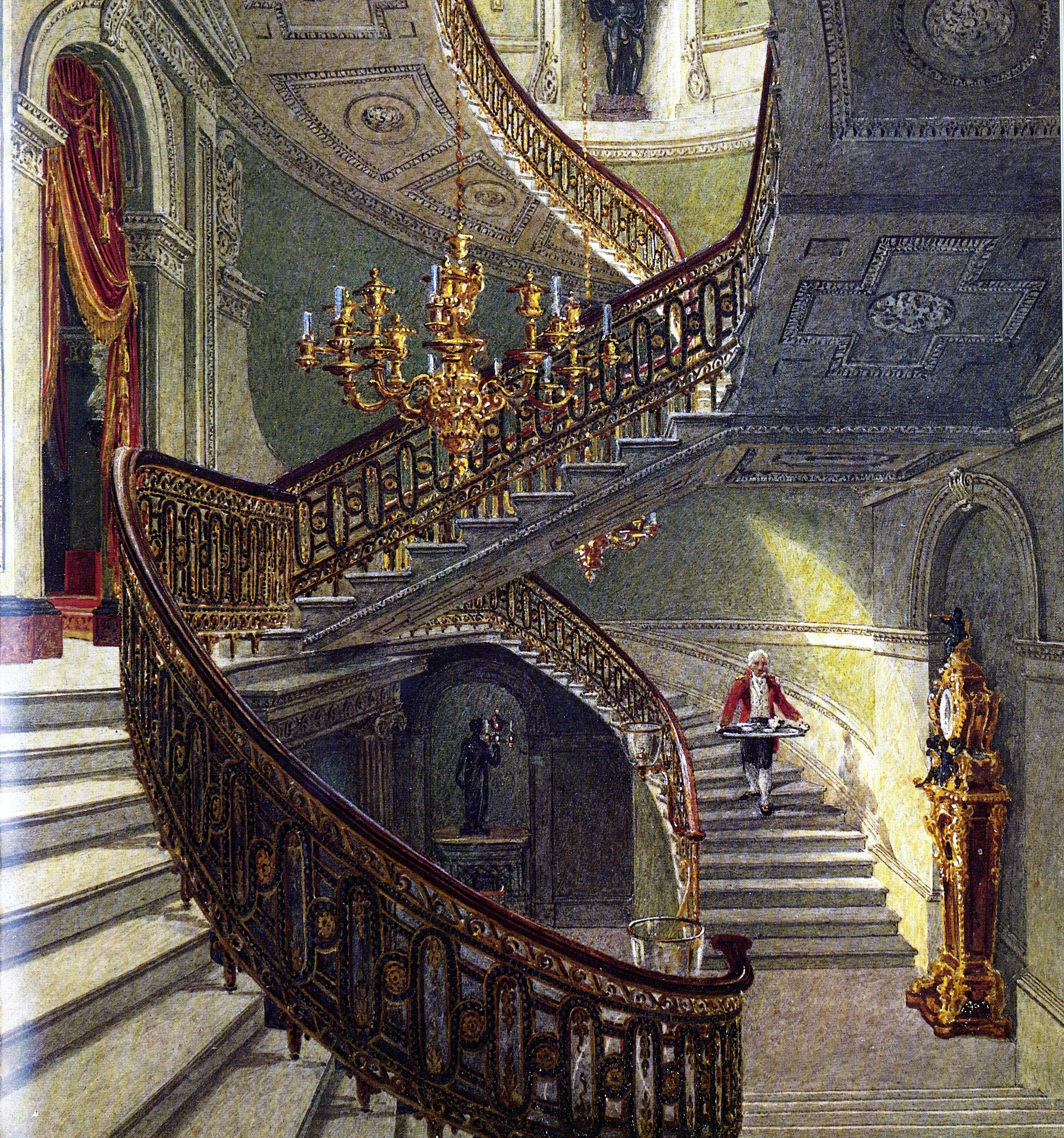
The main staircase, from Pyne's Royal Residences (1819)

Besides the French décor and furniture, Carlton House was hung with a collection of works of art, of which many collected by the Prince are now in the Royal Collection. The Prince patronized contemporary artists such as Reynolds, Gainsborough, and Stubbs. With Francis Seymour-Conway, 3rd Marquess of Hertford and Sir Charles Long acting as his art advisors, the Prince also bought Old Master paintings by Rembrandt, Rubens, van Dyck, Cuyp and Jan Steen. An 1816 inventory of Carlton House showed 136 pictures in the State Rooms, a further 67 in the Prince of Wales's private suite, and another 250 in other parts of the house.

== Demolition ==
Following the death of his father, the new King George IV turned his attention from Carlton House to renovating and greatly enlarging Buckingham House as his primary London residence. This coincided with alterations to the planning of Regent Street, and in order to link Regent Street with the Mall, Carlton House was, notwithstanding the huge and controversial expenditure on it, entirely demolished. The Duke of York Steps and the twin Carlton House Terraces stand on its site.

Most of the furniture, carpets, and artworks in the house were moved to the re-named Buckingham Palace or to other royal residences. Many architectural features were reused since several royal residences were being built or remodelled at the time, including Buckingham Palace and Windsor Castle, although Royal Lodge and possibly the Brighton Pavilion may have received items. Chimney pieces installed at Buckingham Palace are identifiable as having come from Carlton House, as are many doors at Windsor Castle. To save costs in the construction of the new National Gallery in Trafalgar Square, the bases and capitals of exterior columns at Carlton House were reused for the porticos at the east and west entrances, the columns themselves having deteriorated where they were stored in St James' Park.

The house's name persists in the form of the Carlton House desk, which has straight legs with drawers in the frieze and a superstructure that wraps round the back, fitted with tiers of drawers. The name is contemporary and in 1797 was recorded in the in-house cost books of the cabinet-making firm of Gillow, with a sketch. The original, made for the Prince Regent's use at Carlton House, has not been identified.

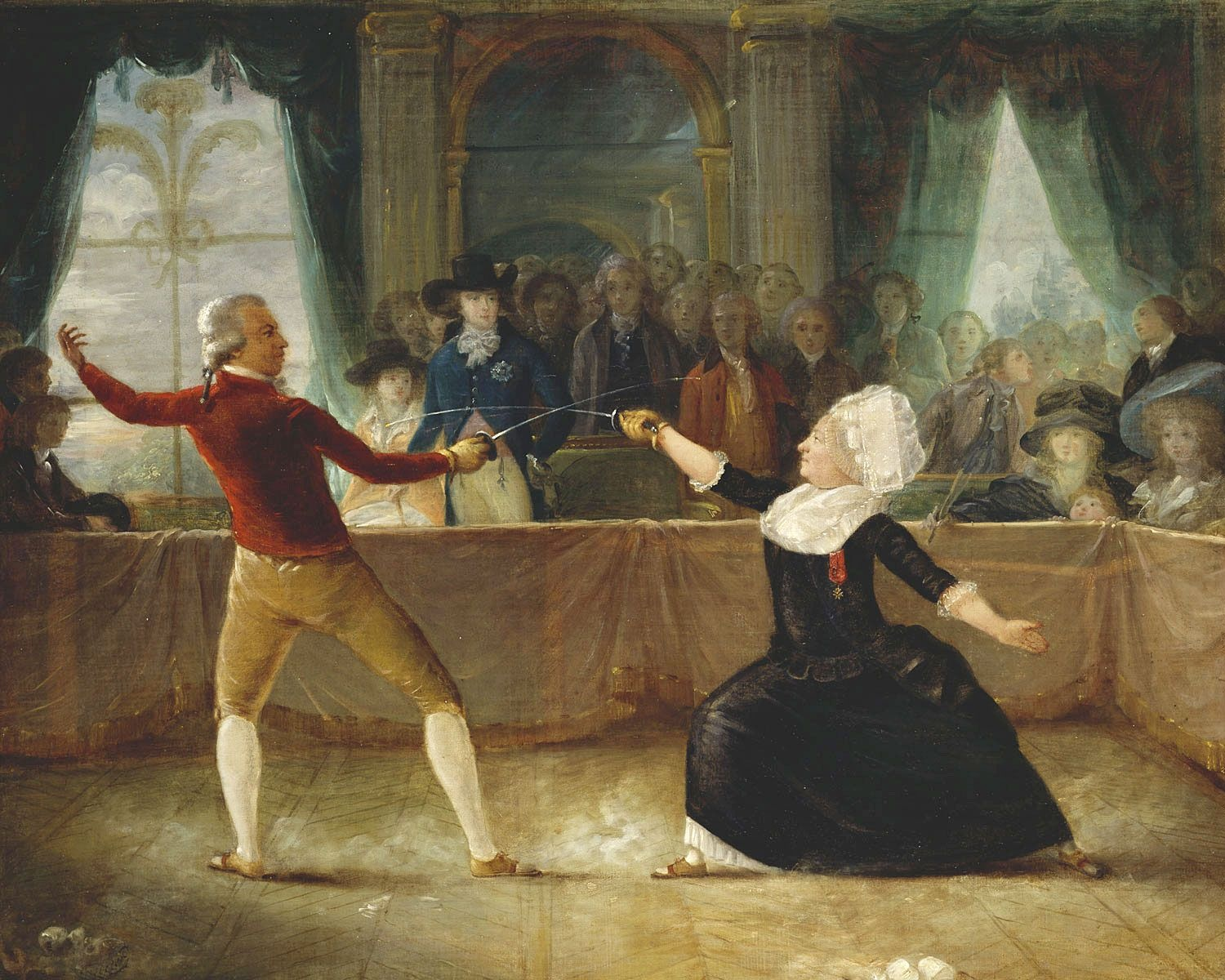
Fencing Match between Chevalier de Saint-Georges and 'La chevalière D'Éon' on 9 April 1787, in Carlton House, painting by Charles Jean Robineau

== Cultural references ==
Oscar Wilde makes reference to Carlton House in his 1890 novel The Picture of Dorian Gray. In chapter 11, as the protagonist looks over portraits of his ancestors, he writes, "What of the second Lord Beckenham, the companion of the Prince Regent in his wildest days... [t]he world had looked upon him as infamous. He had led the orgies at Carlton House."

Carlton House is referenced in the first episode of the 1979 television miniseries Prince Regent, in which George IV, then-Prince of Wales (portrayed by Peter Egan), commissions Henry Holland to refurbish it. When King George III refuses to allow the Prince to go to Germany for his desired military education, he demands Holland refurbish Carlton House with lavish extravagance with neither regard of cost nor his father's wishes.

In the novel Sharpe's Regiment by Bernard Cornwell, the titular character is presented to the Prince Regent inside Carlton House.
