= Repository Woods =

- Location within Royal Borough of Greenwich
- Type: Military training area
- Location: London, SE18
- Coordinates: 51°29′04″N 0°03′12″E
- Area: 7 hectares (17 acres)
- Created: 1802 (land acquired); early 1800s (training landscape developed)
- Operator: Ministry of Defence
- Status: Grade II Registered Park and Garden; Heritage at Risk
- Website: "Repository Woods" (on Parks & Gardens website)

Repository Woods is a 7 acres (2.8 ha) deciduous woodland area to the west of the British Army's Woolwich Garrison in the Royal Borough of Greenwich in southeast London. Created in the early 19th century as a purpose-built training landscape for the Royal Military Repository, it combined practical artillery training grounds with pleasure gardens open to the public. The site is designated at Grade II as the UK's earliest known purpose-built military training landscape. Its features include training and practice earthworks (now a scheduled monument), a stream and man-made lake system, and terraces. A Rotunda, designed by John Nash in 1814, stands at the eastern boundary.

The site has been on Historic England's Heritage at Risk register since 2023 due to lapsed management and loss of key features to woodland succession.

== History ==
The Royal Military Repository had been established in 1778 by Captain William Congreve (1742-1814) as a training establishment to instruct artillery officers in handling heavy ordnance in difficult field conditions. His experiences as a lieutenant firework in Canada during the Seven Years' War had convinced him of the need to train artillery in manoeuvring heavy equipment across varied terrain. Congreve conceived of forming "as extensive a collection as possible of everything tending to improve the science and practice of artillery, and to explain its progress."

In 1801, 60 acres (24 ha) of land were initially leased and then acquired in 1802 from the Bowater family to provide dedicated training grounds for the Repository. This land became the Royal Military Repository training facility, known as the Repository Grounds. The sloping landscape was developed with water features including a large man-made lake with a circular island, created before 1808 and later enlarged with two additional ponds to the south. The central pond was named 'Summerhouse Pond' after a summerhouse on its north side. The ponds were used to teach men "to lay pontoons, to transport artillery upon rafts, and all the different methods that can be adopted for the passage of troops across rivers, &c."

During the 1820s an earthwork training fortification was added along the length of the eastern boundary, on which were mounted "all the different sorts of cannon used in the defence of fortified towns". In 1819, the Rotunda—John Nash's tent-like pavilion originally erected at Carlton House for celebrations honouring the Duke of Wellington—was reconstructed at the eastern edge of the Repository Grounds on the brow of the hill, where it opened as a museum in 1820. The Repository Grounds thus combined multiple functions: practical training landscape, museum setting, and public showcase for British military capability.

In 1838, The Saturday Magazine described Repository Woods as "beautifully diversified and unequal in its surface, and interspersed with several pieces of water, this condition of the ground affords excellent practice to the men in dragging the guns up steep acclivities, or lowering them down rapid descents, turning pontoon bridges to transport them over water and imitating all the operations of actual war." The landscape was regularly visited by British and foreign dignitaries for displays of the British army in training.

Features associated with pleasure ground use include two croquet lawns; a garden building (later modified as a respirator training room) also suggests the site's dual character as both military training ground and accessible landscape.

Later military additions include slit trenches, an assault course (1971), and an underground trench shelter. Two buildings sit within Repository Woods: the respirator training room (a rectangular brick-built building with a slate roof), and a building associated with a rifle range (both constructed between 1916 and 1945).

== Features ==
The woods are in Woolwich on the boundary between Woolwich and Charlton parishes, north of Woolwich Common, Charlton Cemetery and the Napier Lines army depot, and south of Hillreach, a stretch of the B210 road between Woolwich and Charlton. The woodlands are enclosed by fences and brick walls, parts of which are Grade II listed. The Rotunda stands to the east.

The water features include the large man-made lake with its circular island, and two smaller ponds to the south. The linear training earthworks along the eastern boundary are now a scheduled monument. The woods are still used for army training purposes, and an angling club uses the main pond. The nearby barracks are scheduled to close by 2028.

== Designation and condition ==
The woodlands were Grade II listed in March 2011 as "the earliest known purpose-built military training landscape nationally if not in Western Europe." The listing recognises both the site's military training significance and its designed landscape character, combining engineered earthworks, water features, and pleasure grounds into a functional whole.

In November 2023, Repository Woods was included on Historic England's Heritage at Risk register, the only addition that was not a building. Historic England's assessment describes the condition as "generally unsatisfactory with major localised problems," with high vulnerability and a declining trend. Active management of the site has lapsed, and key structures and features are being lost to woodland succession. No Conservation Management Plan exists, and the site's future remains uncertain. The assessment notes that while military use continues and the angling club maintains access to the main pond, the designed landscape elements that made the site nationally significant are deteriorating.

The adjacent Rotunda structure is also on Historic England's Heritage at Risk list, with water ingress causing extensive decay to its timber roof structure.

== Gallery ==
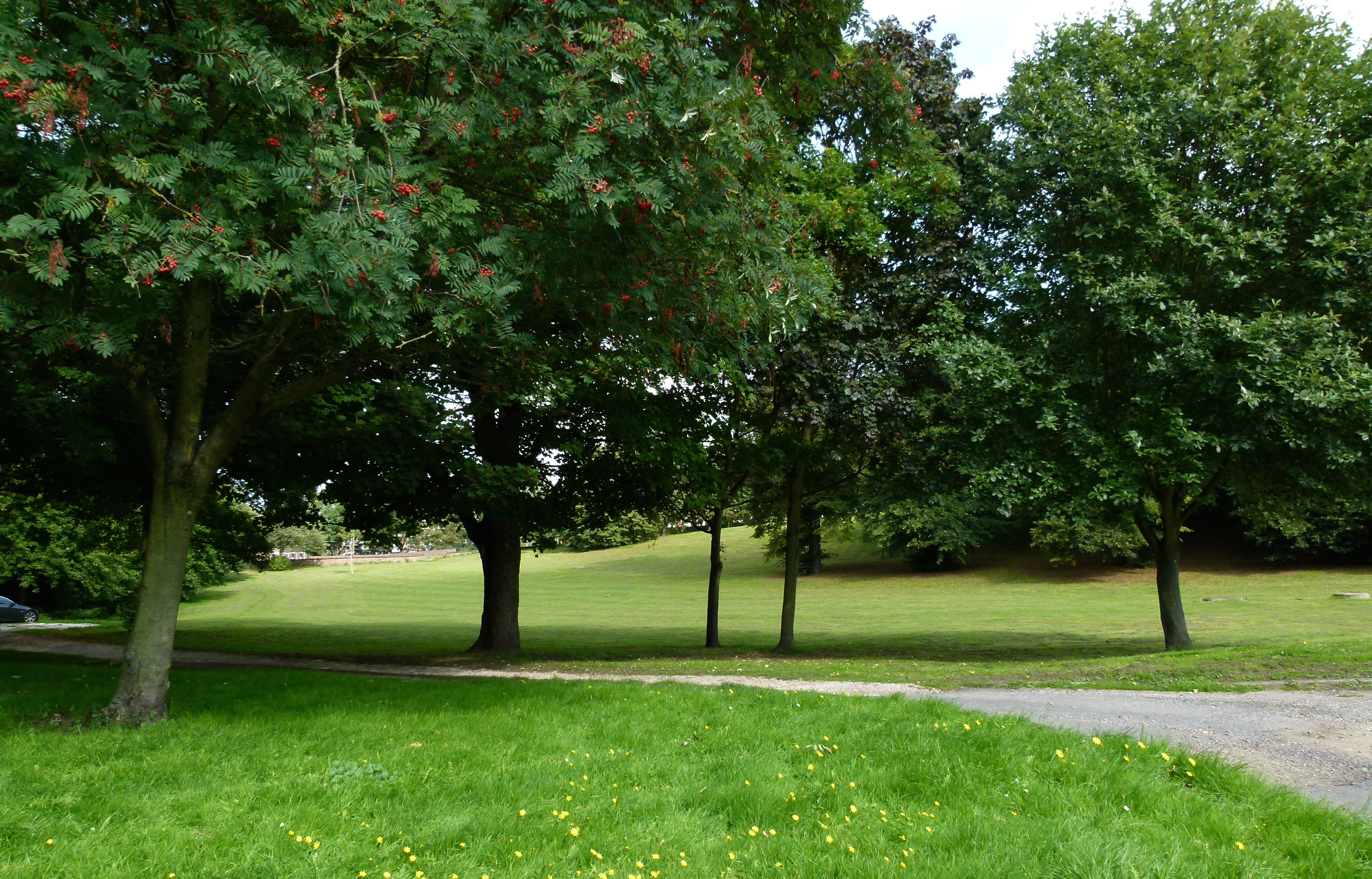
from Green Hill, road leading to Repository Woods

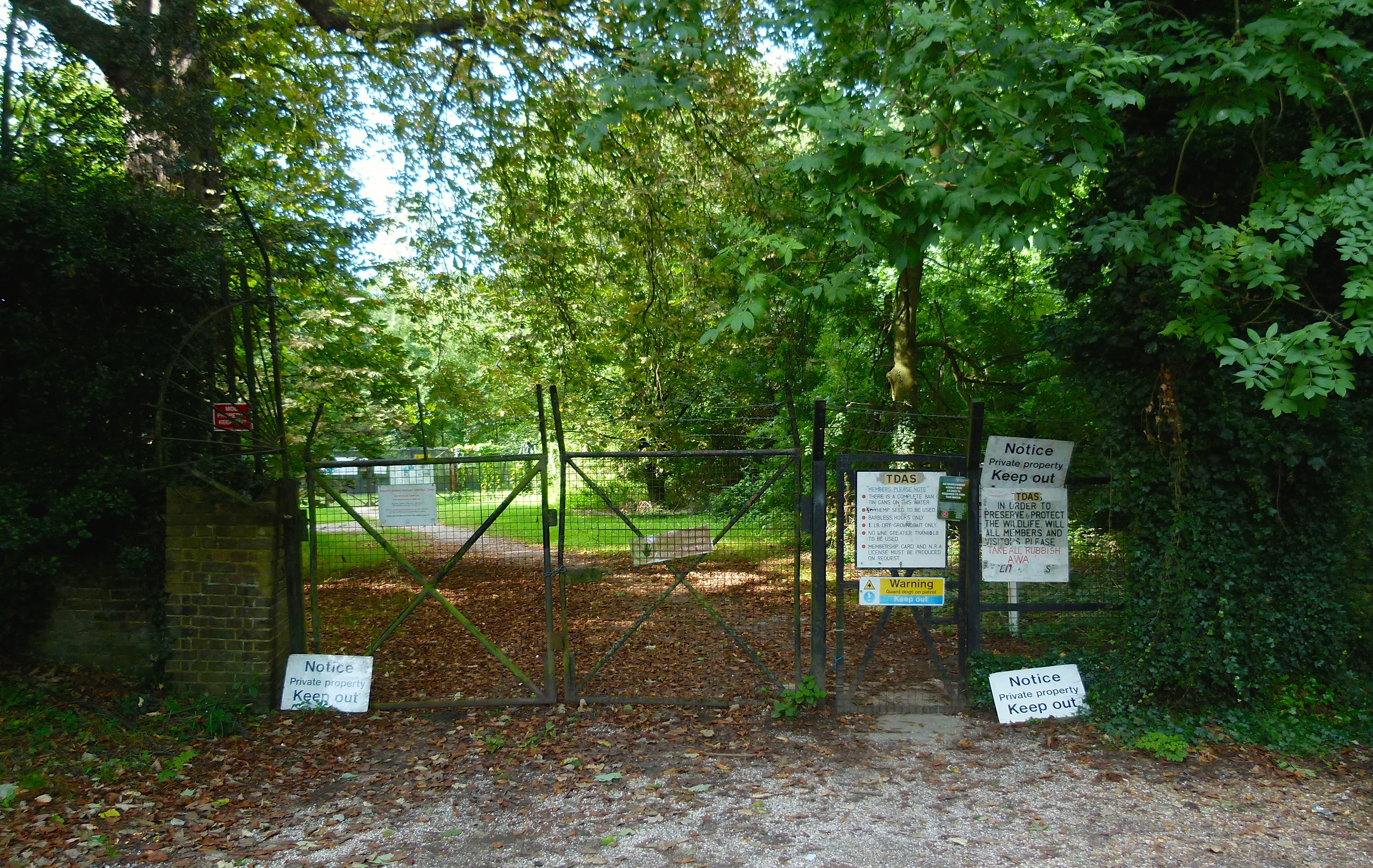
Entrance to Repository Woods

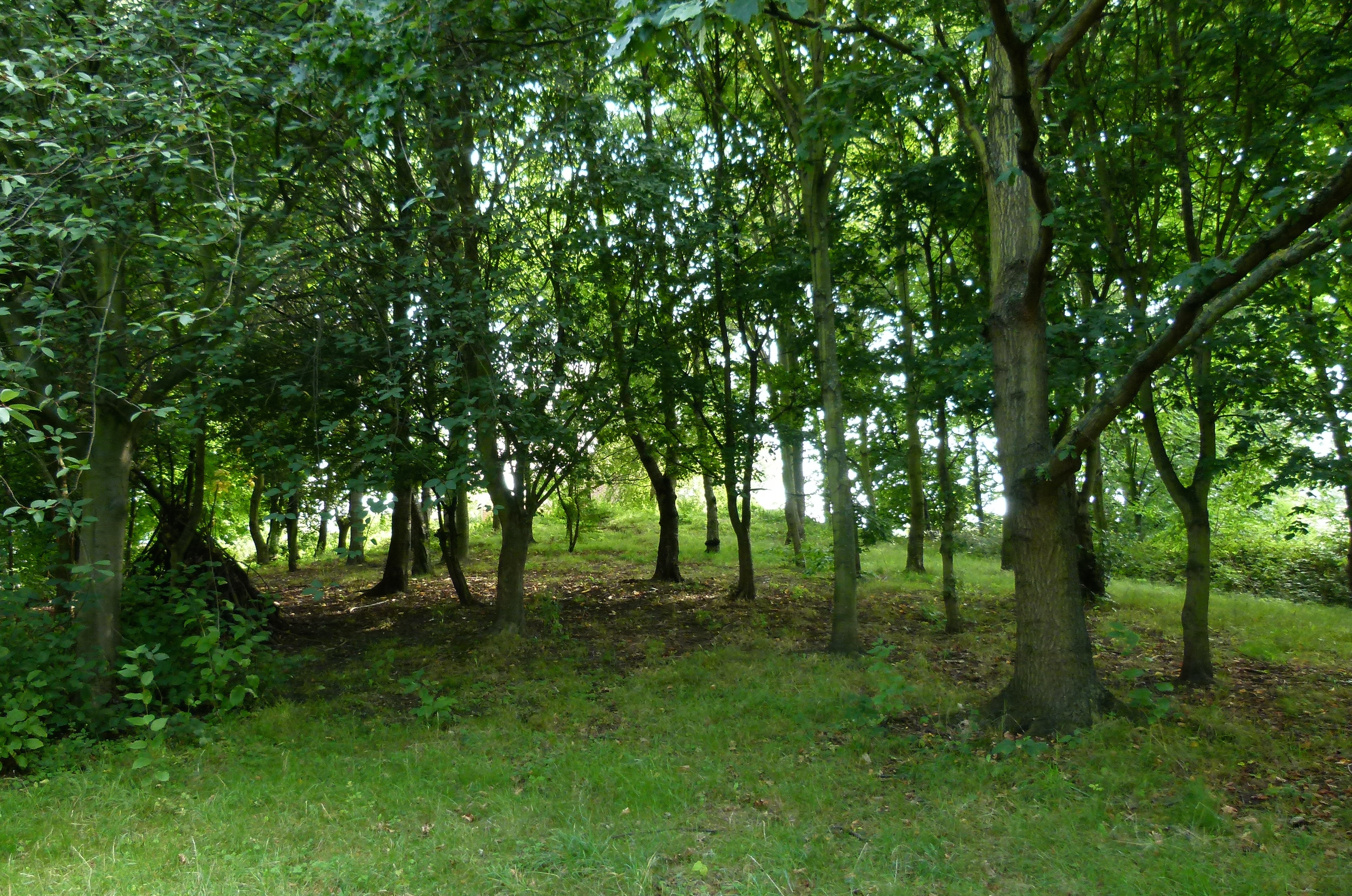
Repository Woods (2015)

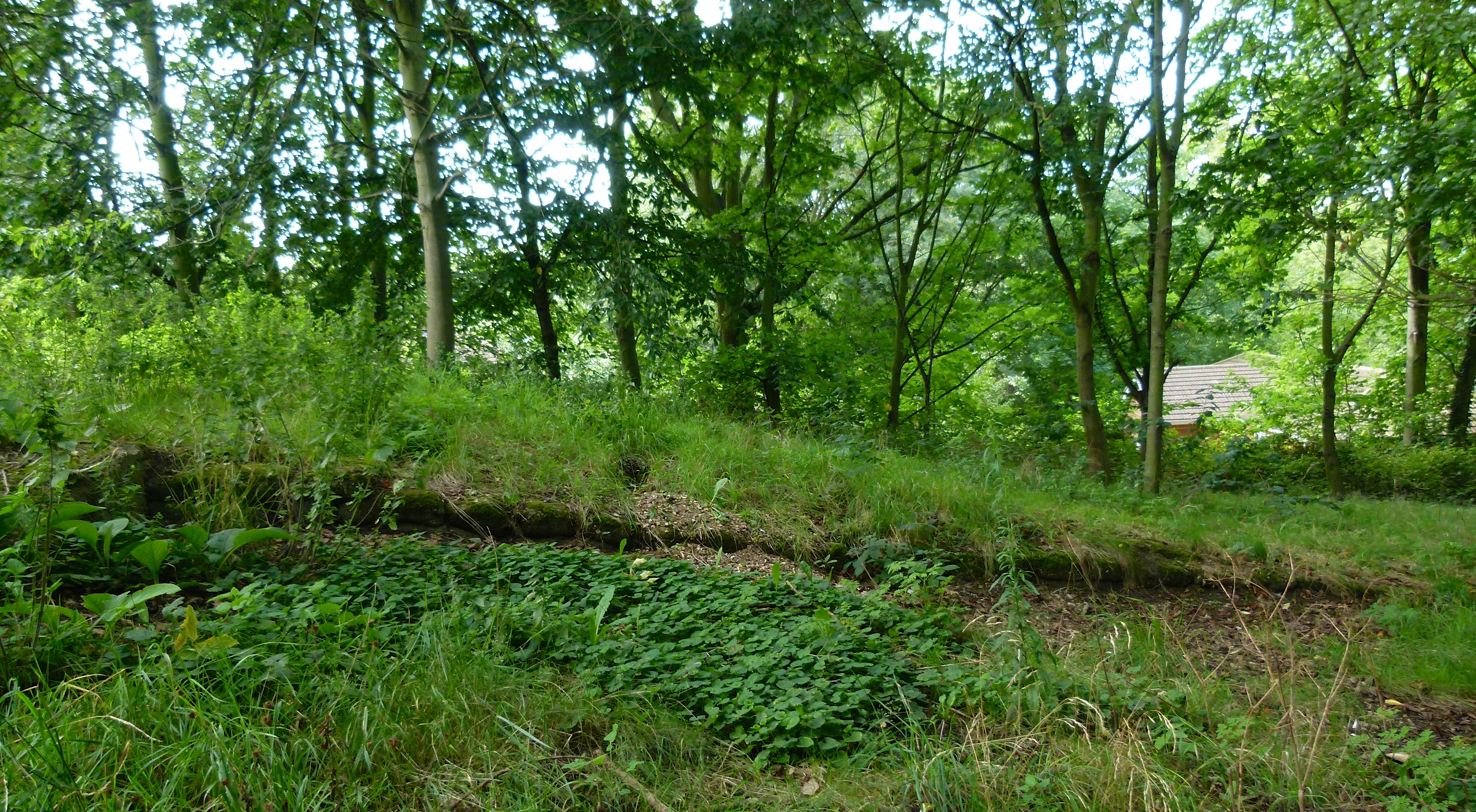
Repository Woods (2015)
