= Royal Artillery Institution Observatory =

Grade II listed building in London, England

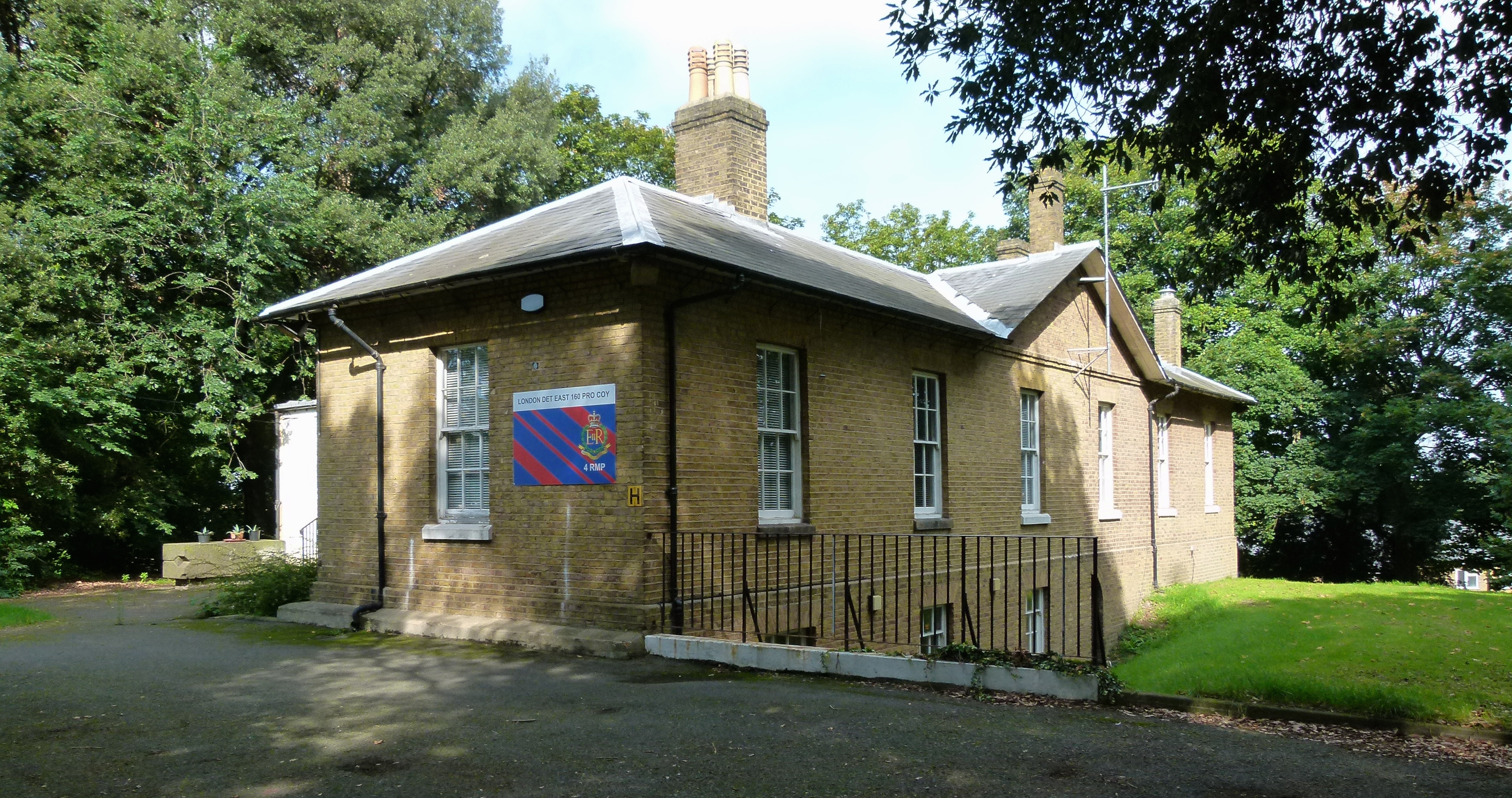
- The Royal Artillery Institution Observatory on Green Hill, Woolwich

- Shown in Greenwich
- 51.484°N 0.054°E
- Location: Green Hill, Woolwich

History
- Built: 1838

Listed Building – Grade II
- Official name: Observatory Married Quarters
- Designated: 8 June 1973
- Reference no.: 1078988

The Royal Artillery Institution Observatory is a Grade II listed building on Green Hill, Woolwich, in south-east London. It was built in 1838 as the first headquarters of the Royal Artillery Institution, a scientific and educational society for officers of the Royal Artillery, founded that year by Lieutenants John Henry Lefroy and Frederick Eardley-Wilmot.

From 1839 the building also served as the base for Edward Sabine's global survey of terrestrial magnetism, a programme of simultaneous observations from stations across the British Empire coordinated by the Royal Artillery under the direction of the Board of Ordnance. Sabine, Lefroy, and Eardley-Wilmot were all closely involved in the survey; the building was known for a period as the Magnetic Office, until the survey moved to Kew Observatory in 1871. The observatory was extended in 1853 with the addition of a domed equatorial room. The Royal Artillery Institution moved to larger premises within the main Royal Artillery Barracks in 1854, but continued to use the observatory for astronomical observations until 1926. The equatorial room was subsequently demolished; the original transit room survives, alongside a pedimented annexe that originally housed the Institution's library and reading room.

It is a Grade II listed building.

== See also ==
- The Rotunda
- Royal Artillery Barracks, Woolwich
- Woolwich Garrison
- Edward Sabine
- John Henry Lefroy
- King's Troop, Royal Horse Artillery
