= Grand Jubilee of 1814 =

British festivities

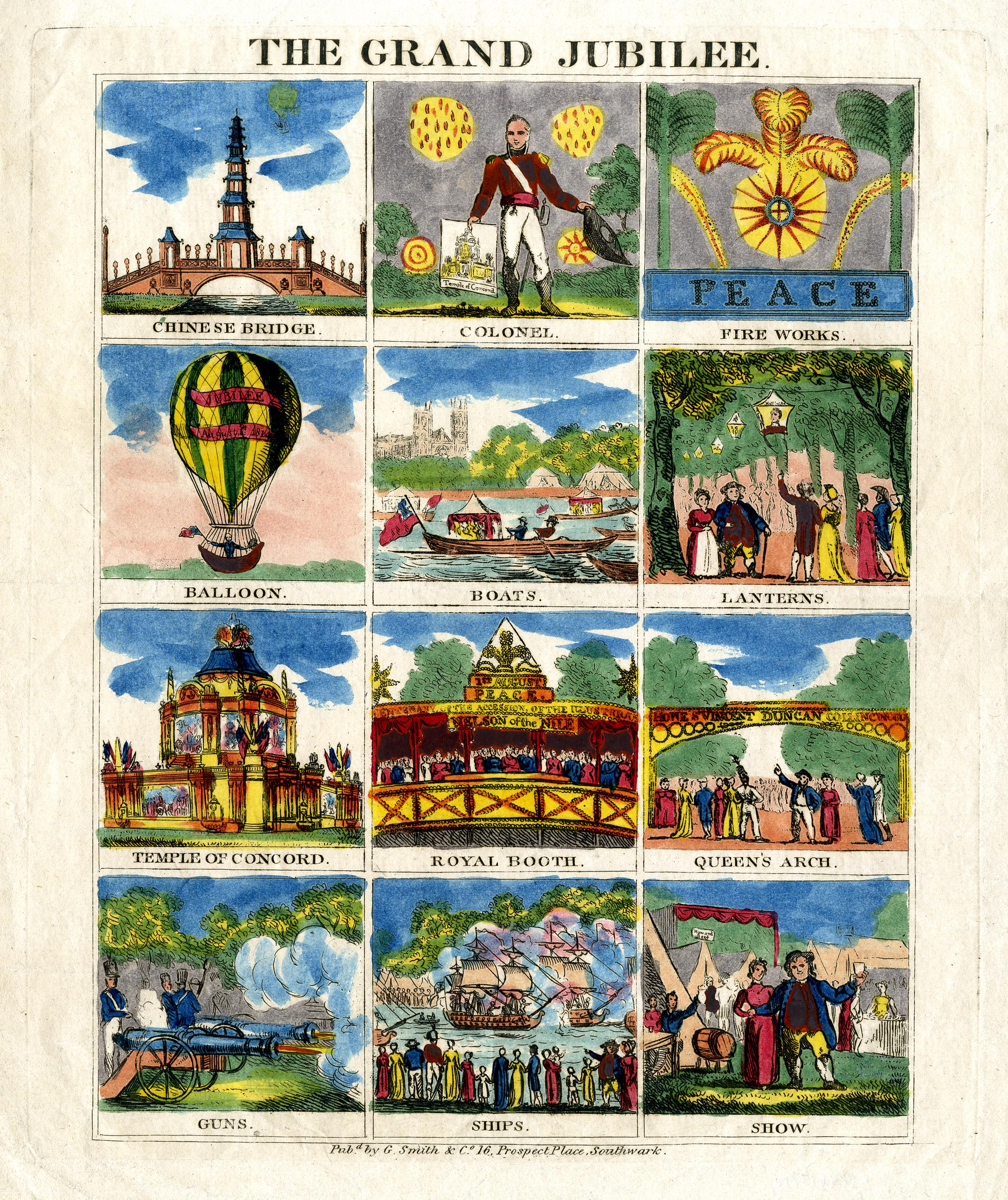
Contemporary printer's sheet with twelve vignettes of the celebrations

The Grand Jubilee of 1814 was a public holiday and celebration in the United Kingdom held on 1 August 1814. The event marked the centenary of the accession of George I, the first king of the House of Hanover, the anniversary of Horatio Nelson's victory at the Battle of the Nile, and the recent signing of the Treaty of Paris, bringing an end (briefly) to the Napoleonic Wars.

Celebrations centred on the Royal Parks in London, with temporary structures erected in St James's Park, Green Park and Hyde Park. The event was billed as "the largest fair, for every kind of amusement, that was ever known in this or any other country" and government employees were granted a public holiday.

== Background ==
The jubilee was held to mark the centenary of the accession of George I, the first king of the House of Hanover, who came to the throne on 1 August 1714 (in the Old Style calendar). The event also marked the anniversary of the first day of the Battle of the Nile and was a celebration of the recent signing of the Treaty of Paris that brought peace with France after more than a decade of the Napoleonic Wars. It was advertised variously as the Jubilee, the Grand Jubilee, the National Jubilee, the Universal Jubilee and the Grand National Jubilee. To mark the occasion a public holiday was granted to government employees.

Napoleon had abdicated in April 1814 and the Treaty of Paris, signed on 30 May, had confined France to her boundaries of 1792. The Allied Sovereigns had visited London in June, and the Duke of Wellington had returned from the Peninsular War. The Prince Regent had hosted the Wellington Fête at Carlton House on 21 July, using temporary buildings designed by John Nash.

The Grand Jubilee was intended as a public celebration. The formal notification stated that "the object of the peaceful festival, is to give to all ranks and orders, a grateful occasion to indulge in that full participation of happiness to which their perseverance, in a most sanguine and trying contest, crowned with unprecedented success, has so richly entitled them".

== Preparations ==
John Nash, the Prince Regent's architect, was responsible for the overall layout and design of the temporary buildings, working closely with Sir William Congreve, Comptroller of the Royal Laboratory at Woolwich, who was in charge of the firework displays.

The fireworks took five hundred men over a month to prepare at Woolwich.

== Carlton House ==
Carlton House, the Prince Regent's palace on Pall Mall, was not a public venue. Its gardens backed onto St James's Park, and the temporary polygon building (later the Woolwich Rotunda) erected for the Wellington Fête on 21 July remained in place.

== St James's Park ==
St James's Park, adjacent to the grounds of Carlton House, was accessible only by ticket. The principal attraction was a Chinese-style bridge designed by Nash, which carried a pagoda across the canal. Birdcage Walk and part of the Mall were hung with Chinese lanterns.

The pagoda was painted yellow, ornamented with black lines, and had a bright blue roof. As darkness fell it was illuminated and became the focus of a pyrotechnic display. However, towards midnight the pagoda caught fire and toppled into the water. At least one man, James Taylor, was killed. The bridge survived and remained in place until 1825.

== Green Park ==
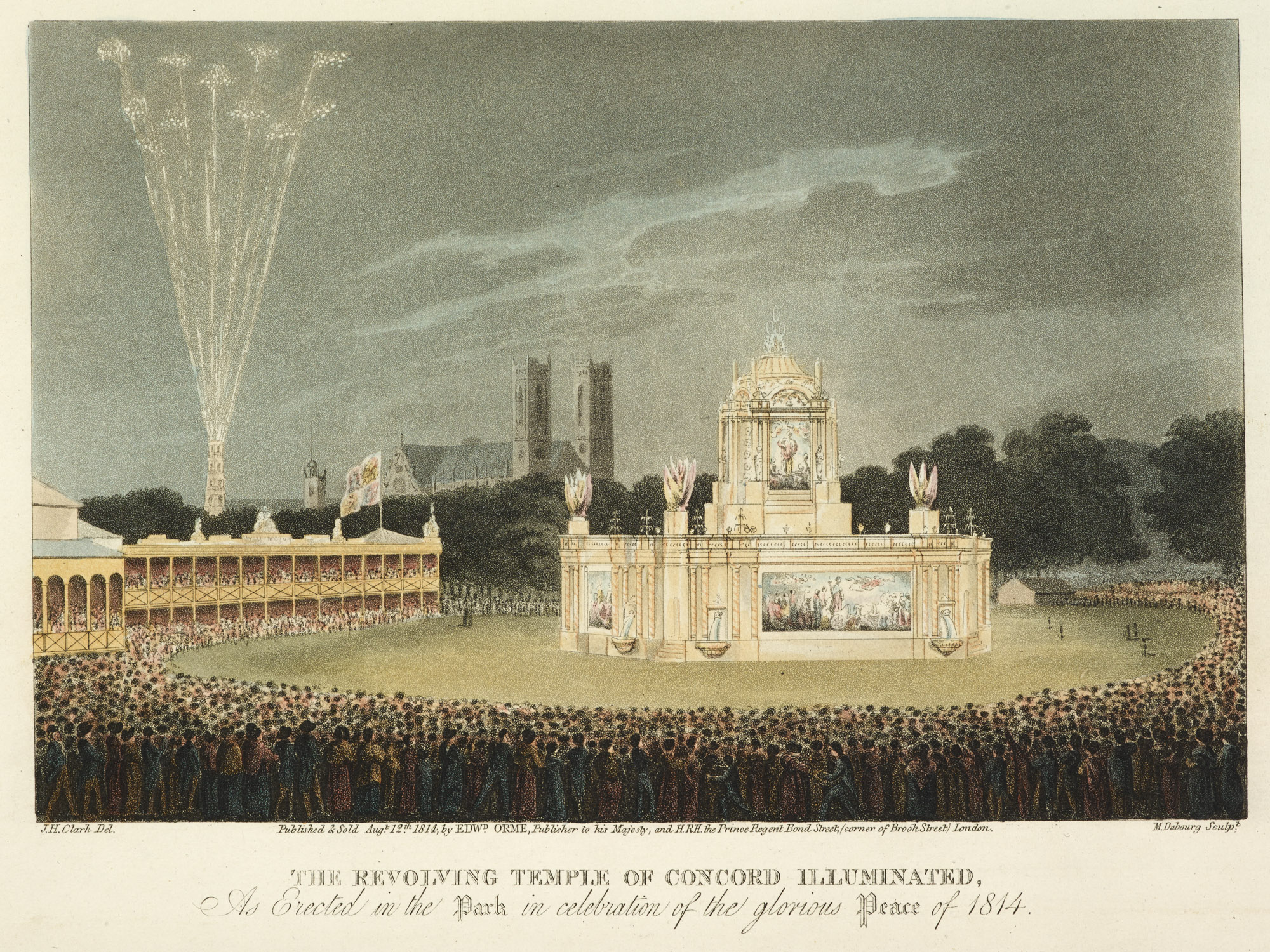
The revolving Temple of Concord in Green Park, designed by Sir William Congreve, depicted in Edward Orme's An Historical Memento (1814)

Green Park was reserved for the fireworks, which began at ten o'clock and were centred on an edifice resembling a Gothic fortress. This structure was designed by Sir William Congreve, inventor of the Congreve rocket. After serving as the focus of a spectacular two-hour firework display, the Gothic fortress was transformed by theatrical mechanism into a revolving Temple of Concord.

The Temple revolved upon its axis, revealing four main compartments, each painted with transparent decoration depicting the origin and effects of war. The subjects were the Deliverance of Europe from Tyranny, the Restoration of the Bourbons by the Aid of the Allies, the Return of Peace, and the Triumph of England under the Regency.

The last of these, also called the Triumph of Britannia, was painted by Thomas Stothard and measured around thirty feet in length. The other transparencies were designed by Henry Howard and executed by Howard along with George Dawe, Genta, William Hilton, Robert Smirke and Samuel Woodforde.

When the temple began to revolve, it did so in the wrong direction, so that the paintings were displayed the wrong side outward. The paintings had to be quickly turned around, dimming the colours. Stothard's transparency was preserved and later acquired by the Rotunda Museum at Woolwich.

A "naval arch" was also erected in Green Park as a bridge between the park and the lawn of Buckingham House. The arch was decorated with the names of naval officers: Howe, Duncan, St Vincent, Collingwood, Broke, Saumarez, Exmouth and others. A royal booth in the park displayed the names "Nelson of the Nile" and "Wellington".

== Hyde Park ==
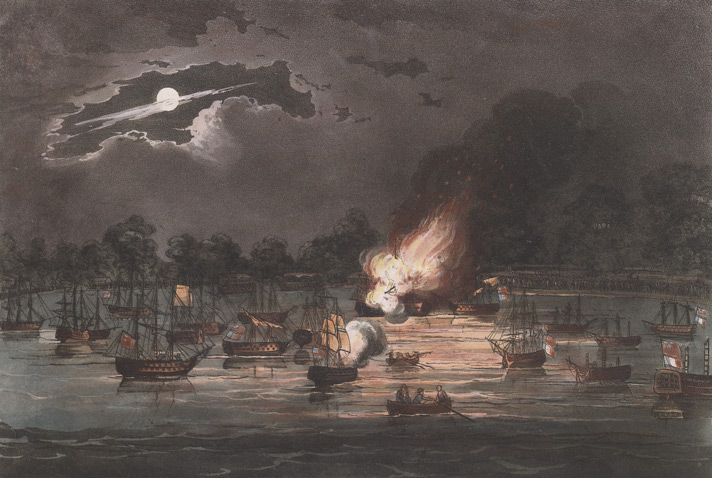
The re-enactment on the Serpentine

In Hyde Park, The Serpentine was the focus of a re-enactment of naval battles between British and French fleets.

== Other events ==
Queen Charlotte held "grand entertainment" at Buckingham House on the day of the jubilee, with new ornaments being provided for the occasion. A flotilla of boats paraded down the River Thames.

The day began at six o'clock with a balloon ascent from Green Park by the aeronaut James Sadler. His son Windham William Sadler also ascended and distributed favours and programmes onto the crowd below.

== The false peace ==
The peace that the jubilee celebrated proved premature. Napoleon escaped from Elba in February 1815 and returned to Paris, beginning the Hundred Days. He was defeated at the Battle of Waterloo on 18 June 1815.

== Celebrations elsewhere ==
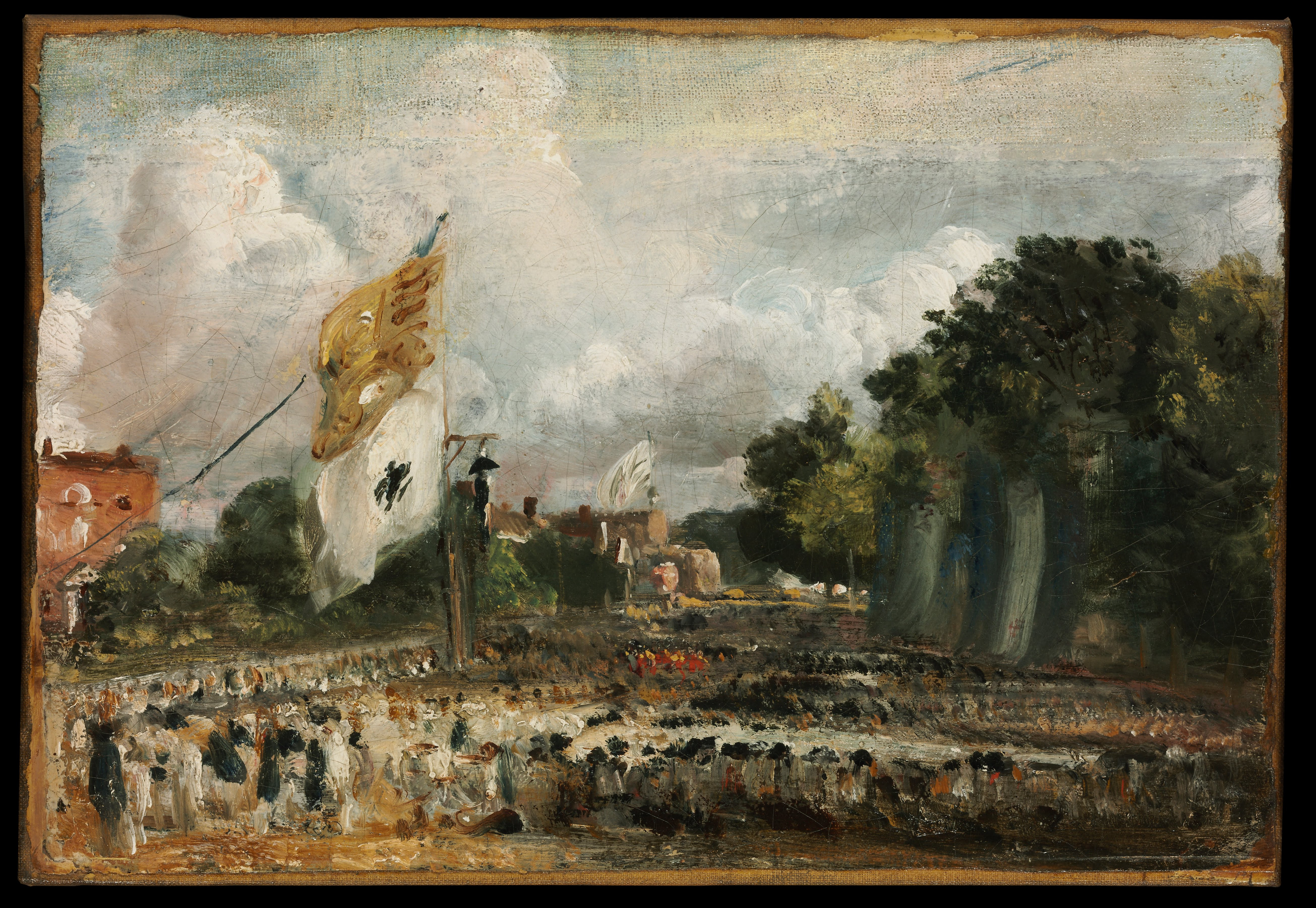
Painting by John Constable of celebrations of peace at East Bergholt

Printers produced numerous keepsakes for the event including depictions of its attractions.

In Dublin, there was a "grand celebration" on 12, 13, 15 and 16 August 1814, the changed dates accommodating the change to New Style dates. On the 12th, the foundation stone of the General Post Office, Dublin was laid by the Lord Lieutenant of Ireland, Charles Whitworth, 1st Earl Whitworth, attended by the Post-Masters-General, Charles O'Neill, 1st Earl O'Neill and Laurence Parsons, 2nd Earl of Rosse. There was a fireworks display on St Stephen's Green; several trees were cut down to make the display more visible.

The Dublin-based medallist Isaac Parkes struck a commemorative medal depicting George, the Prince Regent.

The Grand Jubilee was celebrated in Cork on 1–3 August, and Thomas Wyon the elder struck a commemorative bronze medal.
