= Milecastle 5 =

Milecastle on Hadrian's Wall in England

- Tyne and Wear, England, UK
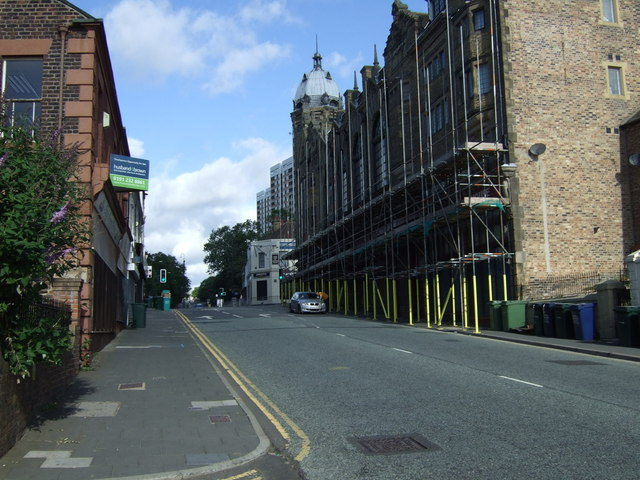
- Milecastle 5 probably lies under the A186 road

Location
- Location in Tyne and Wear
- Coordinates: 54.971402°N 1.628967°W
- Grid reference: NZ23806410

Milecastle 5 (Quarry House) was the first milecastle west of Pons Aelius fort of the Roman Hadrian's Wall. No remains exist of the milecastle, though its supposed position is at the junction of the A186 Westgate road and the B1311 Corporation Street. No remains currently exist.

== Construction ==
Nothing is known of the long/axis or gateways type of Milecastle 5.

== Excavations and investigations ==
- 1732 - Horsley surveyed the area, and noted that he:

thought there were visible signs of a castellum just behind the quarry-house

- 1858 - Henry MacLauchlan agreed the location, stating that:
  It is probable there was a Mile Castle where the Wall makes a bend at the top of Westgate Road
- 1968 - English Heritage Field Investigation. It was noted that all traces of the Milecastle had been obliterated by modern development.

== Associated turrets ==
Each milecastle on Hadrian's Wall had two associated turret structures. These turrets were positioned approximately one-third and two-thirds of a Roman mile to the west of the Milecastle, and would probably have been manned by part of the milecastle's garrison. The turrets associated with Milecastle 5 are known as Turret 5A and Turret 5B.

=== Turret 5A ===
The discovery of Milecastle 4 some way from its presumed location has brought into question the presumed sites of all milecastles and turrets in this area. However, the site is included in the English Heritage Archive.
Presumed location: 54.973223°N 1.636761°W

=== Turret 5B ===
The discovery of Milecastle 4 some way from its presumed location has brought into question the presumed sites of all milecastles and turrets in this area. However, the site is included in the English Heritage Archive.
Presumed location: 54.974144°N 1.644564°W

== Monument records ==
Monument	Monument Number	English Heritage Archive Number
Milecastle 5	25026	NZ 26 SW 3
Turret 5A	22667	NZ 26 SW 4
Turret 5B	25032	NZ 26 SW 5

== Bibliography ==
- Daniels, Charles (1979), "Review: Fact and Theory on Hadrian's Wall", Britannia, 10: 357–364, JSTOR 526069
