= Milecastle 1 =

Milecastle on Hadrian's Wall in England

- Tyne and Wear, England, UK
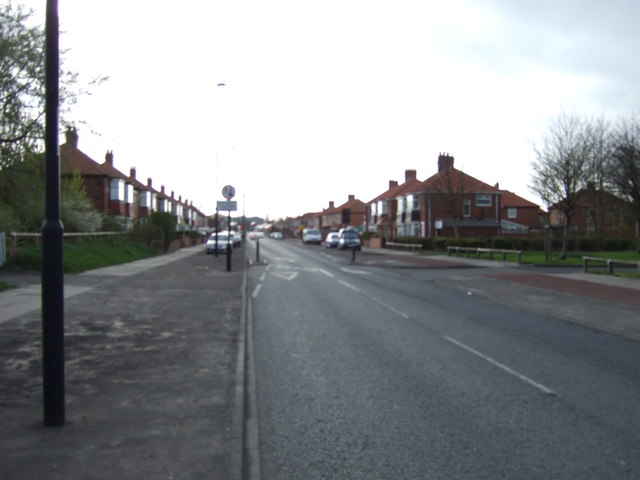
- A187 road in the vicinity of Milecastle 1

Location
- Location in Tyne and Wear
- Coordinates: 54.983494°N 1.550492°W
- Grid reference: NZ28866552

Milecastle 1 (Stott's Pow) was a milecastle of the Roman Hadrian's Wall. It was located near the (now disappeared) valley of Stott's Pow. Its remains are covered over, and are located beneath the recreation ground at Miller's Dene. Early excavations and investigations of Turret 0B were mistakenly interpreted as Milecastle 1. The Milecastle sits within the parish of Wallsend.

== Construction ==
Milecastle 1 was a short-axis milecastle of unknown gateway type. Short-axis milecastles were thought to have been constructed by the legio II Augusta who were based in Isca Augusta (Caerleon).

Milecastle 1 Easting and Northing:

Easting: 360162

Northing: 563796

Milecastle 1 English Heritage number: 1003507.

== Excavations and investigations ==
- 1732 - Horsley recorded the milecastle as short-axis and also its proximity to Stott's Pow.
- 1848 - Collingwood Bruce studied the wall and wrote:
  On the top of the rise about 80 yds from the brook (Stott's Pow) is the site of the first milecastle. The ground is under tillage, but its slightly elevated surface, (has a) number of small stones... sprinkled over it...
- 1852-4 - Henry MacLauchlan surveyed the milecastle's position and recorded it as a short-axis milecastle.
- 1928 - F G Simpson tested the site and found only Roman occupation soil and debris remained, assuming that even the foundations had been robbed away. Simpson measured from outside edge of the east gate of Segedunum to the centre of Milecastle 1 at 1,443 yards (1,319 m). His measurements between the centres of Milecastle 1 and Milecastle 2 was ed 1,453 yards (1,329 m).
- 1947 - The recreation ground which now covers the site of Milecastle 1 was leveled in 1947. Part of the "Wall Ditch" and traces of the milecastle were still according to Grace Simpson. She also stated in her notes (circa 1978) that the fragment of Wall Ditch had now completely disappeared but the trace of the milecastle was still faintly discernible.
- 1975 - English Heritage Field Investigation. It was noted that:
  The site falls in landscaped gardens surrounding a bowling green and there is no trace of the Milecastle.
- 1978 - Grace Simpson (circa 1978) that the fragment of Wall Ditch had now completely disappeared but the "trace of the Milecastle ... is still faintly discernible".

== Associated turrets ==
Each milecastle on Hadrian's Wall had two associated turret structures. These turrets were positioned approximately one-third and two-thirds of a Roman mile to the west of the Milecastle, and would probably have been manned by part of the milecastle's garrison. The turrets associated with Milecastle 1 are known as Turret 1A and Turret 1B.

=== Turret 1A ===
- Turret 1A was probably located very near to what is now the junction of the A187 Fossway, and Coutts Road. This is based on measurement, and no evidence of the turret has been identified. An alternative location would be a third of a Roman mile between the site of Horsely's Milcastle 1 (Turret 0B) and Milecastle 2 (location also doubtful).
- Location on Ordnance Survey 1:25 000 map: 54.981990°N 1.557071°W
- Alternative location on Ordnance Survey 1:25 000 map: 54.983713°N 1.549161°W

=== Turret 1B ===
- Turret 1B was probably located just west of the junction of the A187 Fossway, and Roman Avenue. This location was suggested by FG Simpson, and is based on measurements from Milecastle 2 (the location of which is also in doubt). No evidence of the turret has been identified.
- Location on Ordnance Survey 1:25 000 map: 54.981069°N 1.563253°W

== Monument records ==
| Monument | Monument Number | English Heritage Archive Number |
|---|---|---|
| Milecastle 1 | 24837 | NZ 26 NE 24 |
| Turret 1A | 24781 | NZ 26 NE 4 |
| Turret 1A (alternative) | 24778 | NZ 26 NE 3 |
| Turret 1B | 24786 | NZ 26 NE 5 |
