= Milecastle 2 =

Milecastle on Hadrian's Wall in England

- Tyne and Wear, England, UK
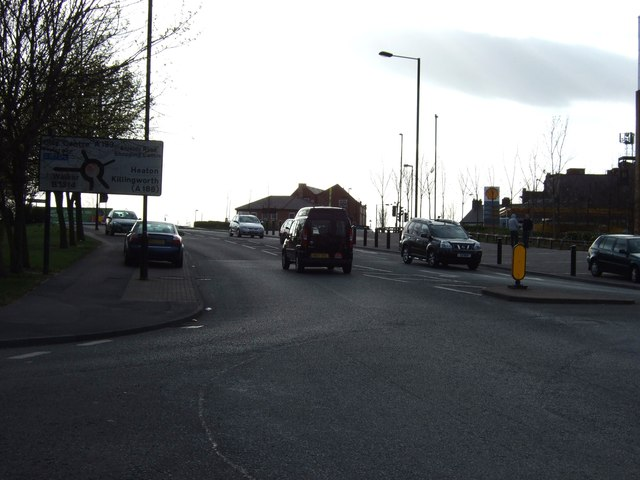
- Milecastle 2 probably lies under the A187 road

Location
- Location in Tyne and Wear
- Coordinates: 54.978979°N 1.569447°W
- Grid reference: NZ27656501

Milecastle 2 (Walker) was a milecastle of the Roman Hadrian's Wall. No remains are currently visible, having been built over, but its probable location is at or near the junction of the A187 Fossway and Tunstall Avenue, in the parish of Wallsend.

== Construction ==
Milecastle 2 was a short-axis milecastle of unknown gateway type. Short-axis milecastles were thought to have been constructed by the legio II Augusta who were based in Isca Augusta (Caerleon).

Northing: 6482, Easting: 2705

== Excavations and investigations ==
- 1732 - Horsley surveyed the milecastle, noting visible remains and recording its position
- 1848 - Collingwood Bruce studied the wall and found the site to have been covered by a brick kiln.
- 1852-4 - Henry MacLauchlan surveyed the milecastle's position, reporting it as short-axis, and recorded.

faint traces of it being discernible in the ploughed ground.

- 1928 - FG Simpson attempted to locate the site, but despite the previous removal of the brick kiln, found only Roman occupation earth and debris. He recorded distances from the presumed location to the centre of Milecastle 1 as 1,453 yards (1,329 m), and to the centre of Milecastle 3 as 1,453 yards (1,329 m).

== Associated turrets ==
Each milecastle on Hadrian's Wall had two associated turret structures. These turrets were positioned approximately one-third and two-thirds of a Roman mile to the west of the Milecastle, and would probably have been manned by part of the milecastle's garrison. The turrets associated with Milecastle 2 are known as Turret 2A and Turret 2B.

=== Turret 2A ===
No remains have been identified of Turret 2A. Two locations have been suggested, one by Eric Birley in 1961, based on Horsley's locations of Milecastle 2 and Milecastle 3, and an alternative by Grace Simpson in 1978, based on Maclauchlin's locations of Milecastle 2 and Milecastle 3.
Location: 54.977519°N 1.575791°W (both locations lie within the same 100m grid square).

=== Turret 2B ===
No remains have been identified of Turret 2B. Two locations have been suggested, one by Eric Birley in 1961, based on Horsley's locations of Milecastle 2 and Milecastle 3, and an alternative by Grace Simpson in 1978, based on Maclauchlin's locations of Milecastle 2 and Milecastle 3.
Location: 54.976636°N 1.580487°W
Alternative location: 54.976642°N 1.582049°W

== Monument records ==
Monument	Monument Number	English Heritage Archive Number
Milecastle 2	1003510	NZ 26 NE 25
Turret 2A	24898	NZ 26 SE 13
Turret 2A (alternative)	25012	NZ 26 SE 57
Turret 2B	24901	NZ 26 SE 14
Turret 2B (alternative)	25013	NZ 26 SE 58

== Bibliography ==
- Daniels, Charles (1979), "Review: Fact and Theory on Hadrian's Wall", Britannia, 10: 357–364, JSTOR 526069
