= Milecastle 3 =

Milecastle on Hadrian's Wall in England

- Tyne and Wear, England, UK
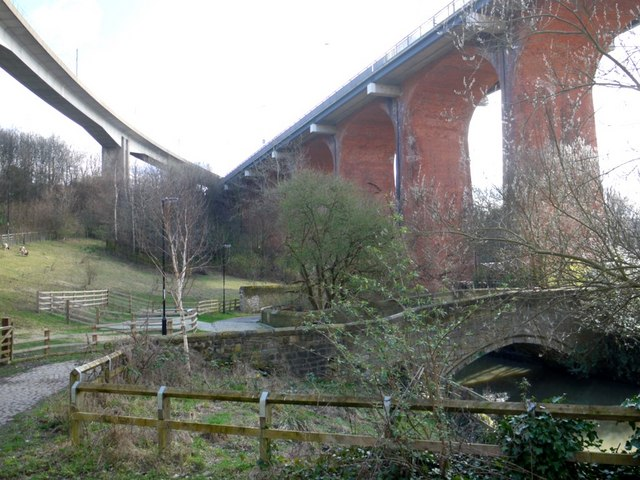
- Milecastle 3 probably overlooked the Ouseburn ravine

Location
- Location in Tyne and Wear
- Coordinates: 54.975901°N 1.589009°W
- Grid reference: NZ26406466

Milecastle 3 (Ouseburn) was a milecastle of the Roman Hadrian's Wall. No remains exist, but it was thought to have been located at the junction of the A187 Byker Bridge and Stephen Street.

== Construction ==
No evidence exists as to the configuration or type of Milecastle 3, though the curtain wall at this stage was almost certainly a narrow configuration.

== Excavations and investigations ==
- 1732 - Horsley surveyed the milecastle, recording its position.
- 1776 - The location was visited by Stukeley, who sketched the area for his Iter Boreale.
- 1789 - Brand visited the site, but noted that many of the stones had been removed from the foundations some years previously, for use in the building of an adjoining house.
- 1848 - Collingwood Briuce reported that a small, partly illegible altar had been found close to the presumed site of the milecastle. The altar (NMR Number: NZ 26 SE 227) was dedicated by Julius Maximus. Having searched the area, he could find no trace of Roman remains.
- 1858 - Henry MacLauchlan surveyed the area but reported no dependable trace of the milecastle.
- 1928 - FG Simpson measured the distance from Milecastle 2 to Milecastle 3 as 1,450 yards (1,330 m).
- 1979 - Exploratory trenches were sunk during the building of the Metro, revealing no trace of the milecastle.

== Associated turrets ==
Each milecastle on Hadrian's Wall had two associated turret structures. These turrets were positioned approximately one-third and two-thirds of a Roman mile to the west of the Milecastle, and would probably have been manned by part of the milecastle's garrison. The turrets associated with Milecastle 3 are known as Turret 3A and Turret 3B.

=== Turret 3A ===
Nothing is known of Turret 3A and it was presumed to be located around 54.974892°N 1.596128°W. In September 2022 Pre-Construct Archaeology announced that they had located the turret at approximately 54°58′28″N 1°35′44.5″W, during surveys in advance of construction of student accommodation. Excavations found the walls of the turret in addition to a ditch and six obstacle pits. Turret 3A became the most easterly known turret on the wall. The turret was recorded as having a length of around 12 metres (39 ft) and foundations of 2.36–2.46 metres (7 ft 9 in – 8 ft 1 in) in width. The interior of the turret is thought to have been truncated by late 19th or early 20th century construction work. A Roman tegula tile was recovered, suggesting that the turret may have had a tiled roof.

=== Turret 3B ===
Nothing is known of Turret 3B.
Presumed location: 54.972217°N 1.602403°W

== Monument records ==
Monument	Monument Number	English Heritage Archive Number
Milecastle 3	24904	NZ 26 SE 15
Turret 3A	24907	NZ 26 SE 16
Turret 3B	24912	NZ 26 SE 17

== Bibliography ==
- Daniels, Charles (1979), "Review: Fact and Theory on Hadrian's Wall", Britannia, 10: 357–364, JSTOR 526069
