= Milecastle 4 =

Milecastle on Hadrian's Wall in England

- Tyne and Wear, England, UK
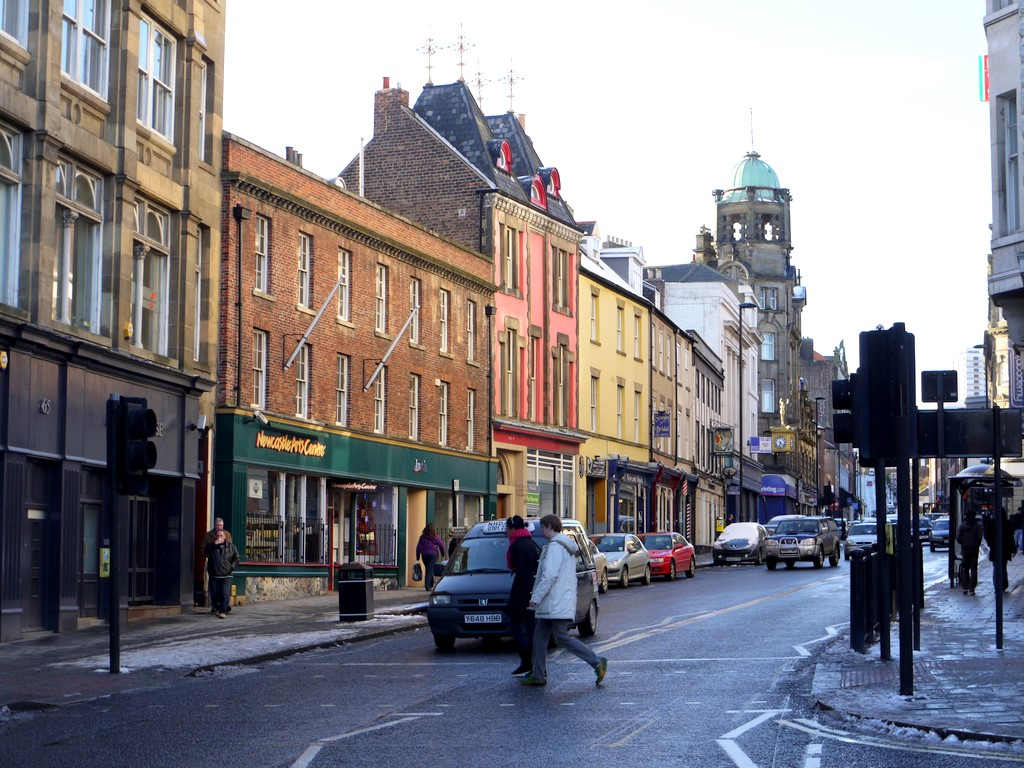
- Milecastle 4 is located beneath Newcastle Arts Centre, the flat-roofed brick building

Location
- Location in Tyne and Wear
- Coordinates: 54.969948°N 1.617812°W
- Grid reference: NZ24526401

Milecastle 4 (Westgate Road) was a milecastle of the Roman Hadrian's Wall. Its remains exist beneath the Newcastle Arts Centre at 67-75 Westgate Road. This position is some way away from its predicted position which is at these coordinates: 54.970440°N 1.608669°W The actual location is between the predicted positions of Turrets 4A and 4B, which has led to suggestions that the numbering and positioning of milecastles and turrets on this part of Hadrian's Wall should be reconsidered.

== Construction ==
Milecastle 4 was a long-axis milecastle of unknown gateway type. Such milecastles were thought to have been constructed by either the legio VI Victrix who were based in Eboracum (York), or the Legio XX Valeria Victrix who were based in Deva Victrix (Chester).

The milecastle was 14.9 metres (49 ft) wide and probably 18 metres (20 yd) long. The excavated south wall was 2.7 metres (8.9 ft) wide and bonded with clay. Its foundations were 2.9 metres (9.5 ft) wide (as were those of the east wall and formed of flags (flag foundations are normally associated with broad wall milecastles.) There was evidence to suggest that the southern gateway had been blocked at some time.

== Excavations and investigations ==
- 1929 and 1930 - Roman pottery was discovered 1,575 yards (1,440 m) along the line of the wall from Milecastle 3. This was taken to be the site of Milecastle 4.
- 1961 - Birley accepts the above location.
- 1985 - The south-west corner of the milecastle was found, and further excavation took place. No occupational layer was discovered and the foundations were sealed by a layer containing predominantly 2nd century pottery fragments, meaning it is likely that the milecastle was demolished before the end of the 2nd century.

== Associated turrets ==
Each milecastle on Hadrian's Wall had two associated turret structures. These turrets were positioned approximately one-third and two-thirds of a Roman mile to the west of the Milecastle, and would probably have been manned by part of the milecastle's garrison. The turrets associated with Milecastle 4 are known as Turret 4A and Turret 4B, however the established milecastle position is between the supposed turret positions.

=== Turret 4A ===
Nothing is known of Turret 4A. Due to the discovery of Milecastle 4 further west than the measured position of this turret, there is no monument record or assumed position.

=== Turret 4B ===
Nothing is known of Turret 4B. Due to the discovery of Milecastle 4 further west than the measured position of Turret 4A, it is extremely unlikely that the positions assumed by Birley were accurate. However, a monument record exists for that location.

== Monument records ==
Monument	Monument Number	English Heritage Archive Number
Milecastle 4	623285	NZ 26 SW 118
Original Milecastle Site	24917	NZ 26 SE 18
Turret 4A	n/a	n/a
Turret 4B	25023	NZ 26 SW 2

== Bibliography ==
- Daniels, Charles (1979), "Review: Fact and Theory on Hadrian's Wall", Britannia, 10: 357–364, JSTOR 526069
- Breeze, David J (1934) Handbook to the Roman Wall. Reprint, Newcastle upon Tyne: Society of Antiquaries, 2006.
- Harbottle B., Fraser R., Burton F. C., Dore J. N., Casey P. J., Huntley J. P. (1988) 'The Westgate Road Milecastle, Newcastle upon Tyne, Society for the Promotion of Roman Studies' Britannia, 19, pp. 153–162.
- Breeze D. J. and Dobson B. (1976) Hadrian's Wall, London: Allen Lane.
