= Milecastle 0 =

Milecastle on Hadrian's Wall in England

- Tyne and Wear, England, UK
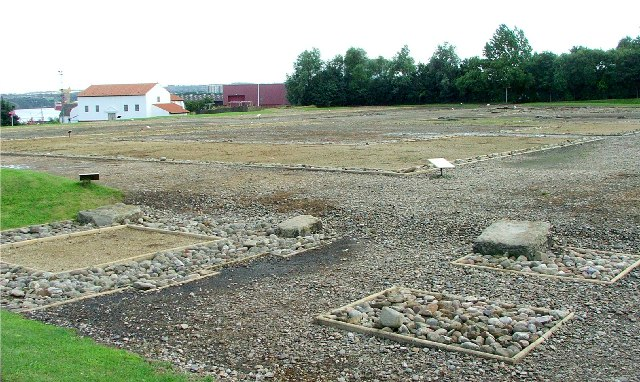
- Segedunum – If Milecastle 0 had existed, it would have been located here

Location
- Location in Tyne and Wear
- Coordinates: 54.98791°N 1.53231°W
- Grid reference: NZ300660

Milecastle 0 is a possible milecastle of the Roman Hadrian's Wall which may have preexisted the fort of Segedunum at Wallsend, at the eastern end of the Wall. Although its existence has been suggested by historian Peter Hill, no evidence of this milecastle has been found. It is not known whether the decision to establish forts on the line of the wall predated the decision to extend the wall to Wallsend, so it is possible that this milecastle was never built. Alternatively it may have been built and later completely demolished.

== Construction ==
Nothing is known of the construction of Milecastle 0.

== Excavations and investigations ==
No excavations or investigations have taken place specifically for Milecastle 0. No evidence has been found during excavation of Segedunum.

== Associated turrets ==
Each milecastle on Hadrian's Wall had two associated turret structures. These turrets were positioned approximately one-third and two-thirds of a Roman mile to the west of the Milecastle, and would probably have been manned by part of the milecastle's garrison. The turrets associated with Milecastle 0 are known as Turret 0A and Turret 0B.

=== Turret 0A ===
Nothing is known of this Turret.
Presumed site: 54.987261°N 1.536619°W

=== Turret 0B ===
Turret 0B (St Francis) is located east of St Francis Community Centre. It was first noted by John Horsley in 1732 who mistook it for Milecastle 1, and it is sometimes referred to as Horseley's Milecastle 1.
Eric Birley (still understanding it to be Milecastle 1) considered that it was rediscovered by Canon Fowler in 1877, and the structure was also recorded (and identified as a Turret) by John Collingwood-Bruce and Robert Blair , when it was discovered during the digging for foundations of 'The Grange'. The Turret was confirmed as such by Grace Simpson with reference to an article in The Evening Chronicle on 15 August 1936, which described an extension of Stotts Road, Walker which cut through 'the Roman Wall and one of its turrets near the Grange'. The turret's stones were later removed to Carville Chapel grounds to form rock gardens.

A single course of this Turret was unearthed in 1978.
Location: 54.985265°N 1.543440°W

== Monument records ==
Monument	Monument Number	English Heritage Archive Number
Milecastle 0	None	None
Turret 0A	24774 (alternative – 26532)	NZ 26 NE 1 (alternative – NZ 36 NW 7)
Turret 0B	24777	NZ 26 NE 2

== Bibliography ==
- Daniels, Charles (1979), "Review: Fact and Theory on Hadrian's Wall", Britannia, 10: 357–364, JSTOR 526069
