= Board of Ordnance =

English and British body responsible for forts

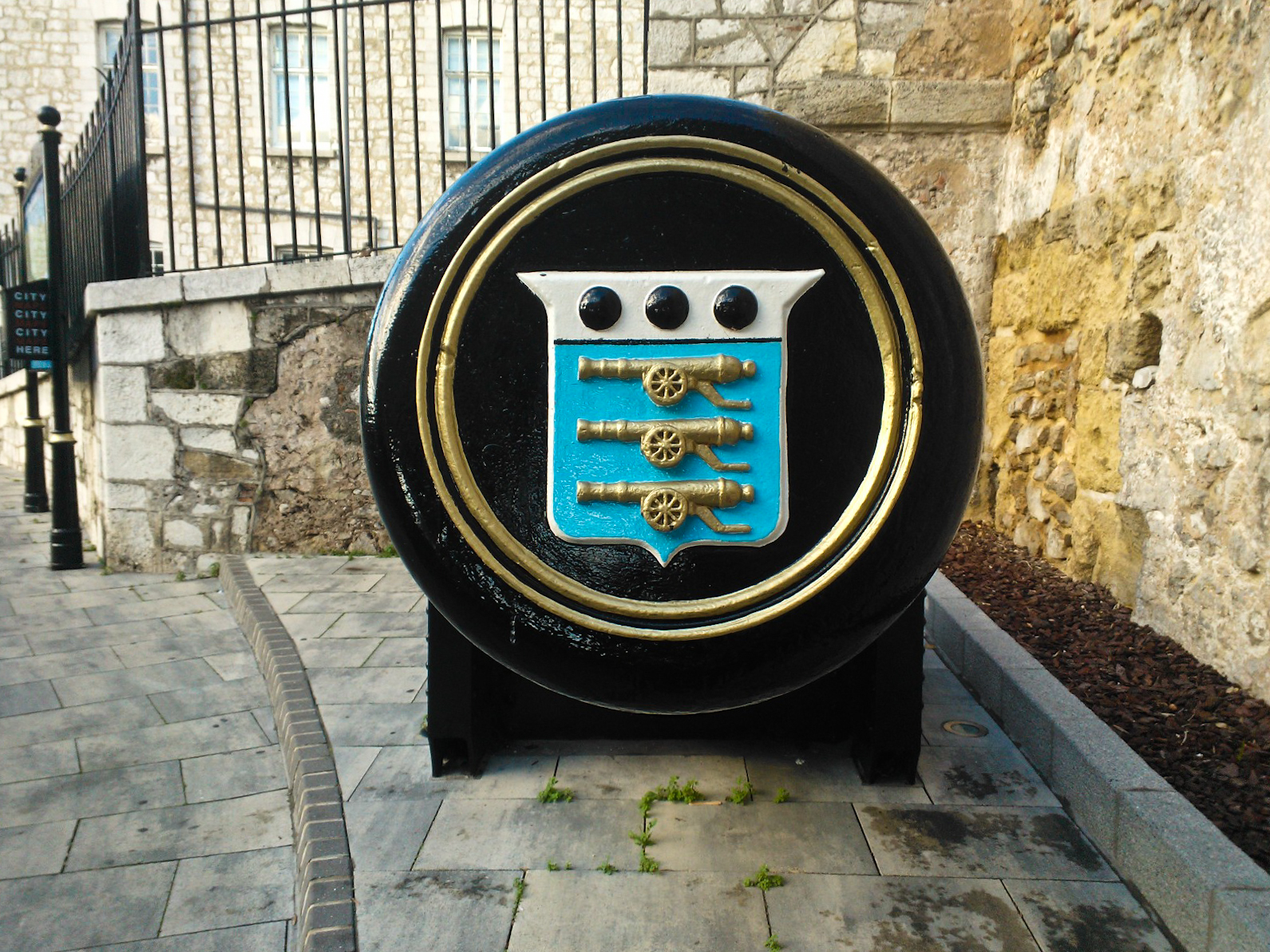
Shield of the Board of Ordnance preserved on a gun tampion in Gibraltar

The Board of Ordnance was a British government body. Established in the Tudor period, it had its headquarters in the Tower of London. Its primary responsibilities were 'to act as custodian of the lands, depots and forts required for the defence of the realm and its overseas possessions, and as the supplier of munitions and equipment to both the Army and the Navy'. The Board also maintained and directed the Artillery and Engineer corps, which it founded in the 18th century. By the 19th century, the Board of Ordnance was second in size only to HM Treasury among government departments. The Board lasted until 1855, at which point (tarnished by poor performance in supplying the Army in Crimea) it was disbanded.

== Origins ==
The introduction of gunpowder to Europe led to innovations in offensive weapons, such as cannon, and defences, such as fortifications. From the 1320s a member of the Royal Household, the 'Keeper of the Privy Wardrobe in the Tower of London', became increasingly responsible for the procurement, storage and distribution of weapons. His office and main arsenal were located in the White Tower. This 'Privy Wardrobe in the Tower' grew, both in size and significance, after the start of the Hundred Years' War.

During the following century, the influence of the Privy Wardrobe and its staff receded, and no new Keepers were appointed after 1476. In its place, a distinct Office of Ordnance began to establish itself at the Tower; this body was responsible for firearms and artillery, and was staffed in the 1460s by a Master, a Clerk and a Yeoman. In the 1540s, during the reign of Henry VIII, the Ordnance Office was expanded, with new officers appointed and their principal duties clarified.

In 1671, the Office of Ordnance took over the work of the Office of Armoury at the Tower; the Armoury had been a parallel body which was originally responsible for armour and edged weapons, but its activities had gradually widened over time, causing a degree of duplication. At this time, the Ordnance Office also began to conduct oversight of the nation's forts and fortifications. In 1683, the board of management (first assembled in 1597) was formally constituted as the Board of Ordnance by Warrant of King Charles II; it consisted of five Principal Officers meeting under the chairmanship of the Master-General. At the same time it was given a new constitution ('Instructions') by Lord Dartmouth, the Master-General. These detailed Instructions continued, with relatively little change, to provide the working framework for the Board and its officers until the early 19th century. The Board was a decision-making body, answerable to the Master-General who had power of veto. (He was also empowered to act independently of the Board). They were required to meet at least twice a week (8am every Tuesday and Thursday) at the Tower in order to transact business.

=== Principal officers ===
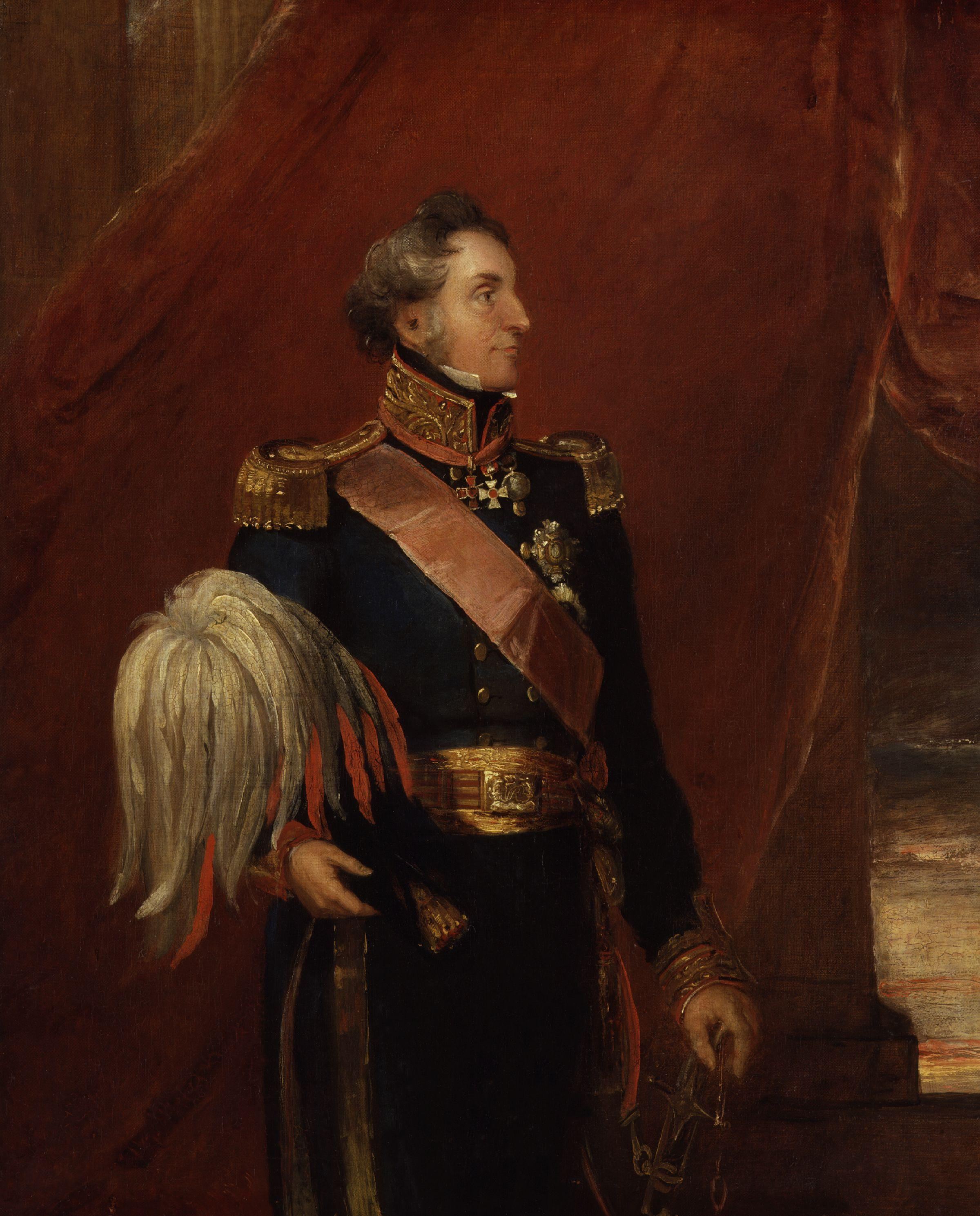
Lord Vivian in uniform of Master-General of the Ordnance. The two senior officers of the Ordnance wore uniforms as for a general and lieutenant-general respectively, but of blue cloth with scarlet facings (rather than scarlet with blue).

By the mid-16th century the Master was assisted by five 'Principal Officers' who later went on to form the Board, which thus consisted of:

Two overseers:

- Master (later Master-General) of the Ordnance (head of the board and commander-in-chief of the corps)
- Lieutenant (later Lieutenant-General) of the Ordnance (deputy to the Master and second-in-command of the corps)

And four heads of department:

- Surveyor (later Surveyor-General) of the Ordnance (in charge of quality)
- Clerk of the Ordnance (in charge of purchasing)
- Storekeeper (later Principal Storekeeper) of the Ordnance (in charge of storage)
- Clerk of the Deliveries of the Ordnance (in charge of issuing)

The offices of Master of the Ordnance and Clerk of the Ordnance may be said to date from 1414, when Letters Patent were issued on behalf of Henry V of England to 'Nicholas Merbury, Master of our Works, Engines, Cannons and other kinds of Ordnance for War, and to John Louth, Clerk of the same Works' (though it appears that these were appointments for service in the field of war rather than to a permanent position). Merbury was present at the Siege of Harfleur and (albeit without his guns) at the Battle of Agincourt. By 1450 Master of Ordnance was a permanent appointment, firmly based at the Tower of London.

The office of Yeoman of the Ordnance (established in 1430 to oversee both the storage of weapons and accoutrements and their delivery for use in the field) was abolished in 1543 and its duties were split between two new officers: the Storekeeper of the Ordnance and Clerk of the Deliveries. At the same time the office of Surveyor of the Ordnance was also established.

Until 1544 the Master had generally managed the day-to-day activities of the Ordnance Office. In that year, however, King Henry VIII appointed his brother-in-law Thomas Seymour as Master of the Ordnance, displacing the incumbent Sir Christopher Morris, who continued his previous work but with a new title: Lieutenant of the Ordnance. Thereafter the Lieutenant (or Lieutenant-General) had day-to-day oversight of the Board's activities, while Master (or Master-General) had more the role of a statesman and supervisor (albeit still with specific responsibilities to the Board and its work).

From the 17th century through till 1828 the Master-General routinely had a seat in Cabinet, and thus served as de facto principal military adviser to the government. Some of the most illustrious soldiers of their generation served as Master-General: Marlborough, Cadogan, Cornwallis, Hastings, Wellington, Hardinge.

While the offices of Master-General and Lieutenant-General were almost always filled by prominent soldiers, the Ordnance Office was a largely civilian organisation up until the formation of its Artillery and Engineer corps in the early 18th century. Prior to 1716, civilians were generally employed as gunners and engineers by the Board; Storekeepers and their subordinates were also civilians (and remained so through till the Board's demise in the 1850s) as were those engaged in manufacturing. Having established the Royal Artillery and Royal Engineers, however, the Board had parallel oversight of both a Military and a Civil Establishment. The Master-General was head of both Establishments; on a practical level, the Lieutenant-General had day-to-day oversight of the military personnel and the Surveyor-General oversaw the civil departments.

=== Other personnel ===
From its earliest years, the Ordnance Office was staffed by a large number of Clerks to manage its substantial administrative functions. A number of other officials reported to the board, including furbishers, proofmasters, keepers and fireworkers.

Two appointments stand out, as they (like the six Board members) were appointed by Letters Patent under the Great Seal of the Realm: namely the Master Gunner of England and the Chief Engineer. These were the senior technicians on the staff. The appointment of Master Gunner was first made as early as 1485, though it ceased after the establishment of the Regiment of Artillery in the 18th century; that of Chief Engineer was instituted in 1660.

The Treasurer of the Ordnance was another important officer of the department, although he did not sit on the board. This office was instituted in 1670 (its duties having previously been discharged by the Lieutenant-General); the post was consolidated with several others in 1836 to form that of Paymaster General.

The Master of Naval Ordnance was a specific office established in 1546 who was assigned to the Council of the Marine and acted as a liaison between both boards.

The Board also had a network of officers in place in key forts, ordnance yards and other installations throughout the Realm (including overseas). The senior Ordnance officer in these locations was usually termed the Storekeeper, and he was responsible directly to the Board. Prior to the Union of the Crowns there was a Master of the Ordnance in the North (with oversight of Berwick, Newcastle and the nearby coastal forts) who had greater autonomy, though he was reliant on the London office for most supplies. Moreover, a Master of the Ordnance in Dublin oversaw a largely independent Irish Board of Ordnance until 1801.

=== Coat of Arms ===
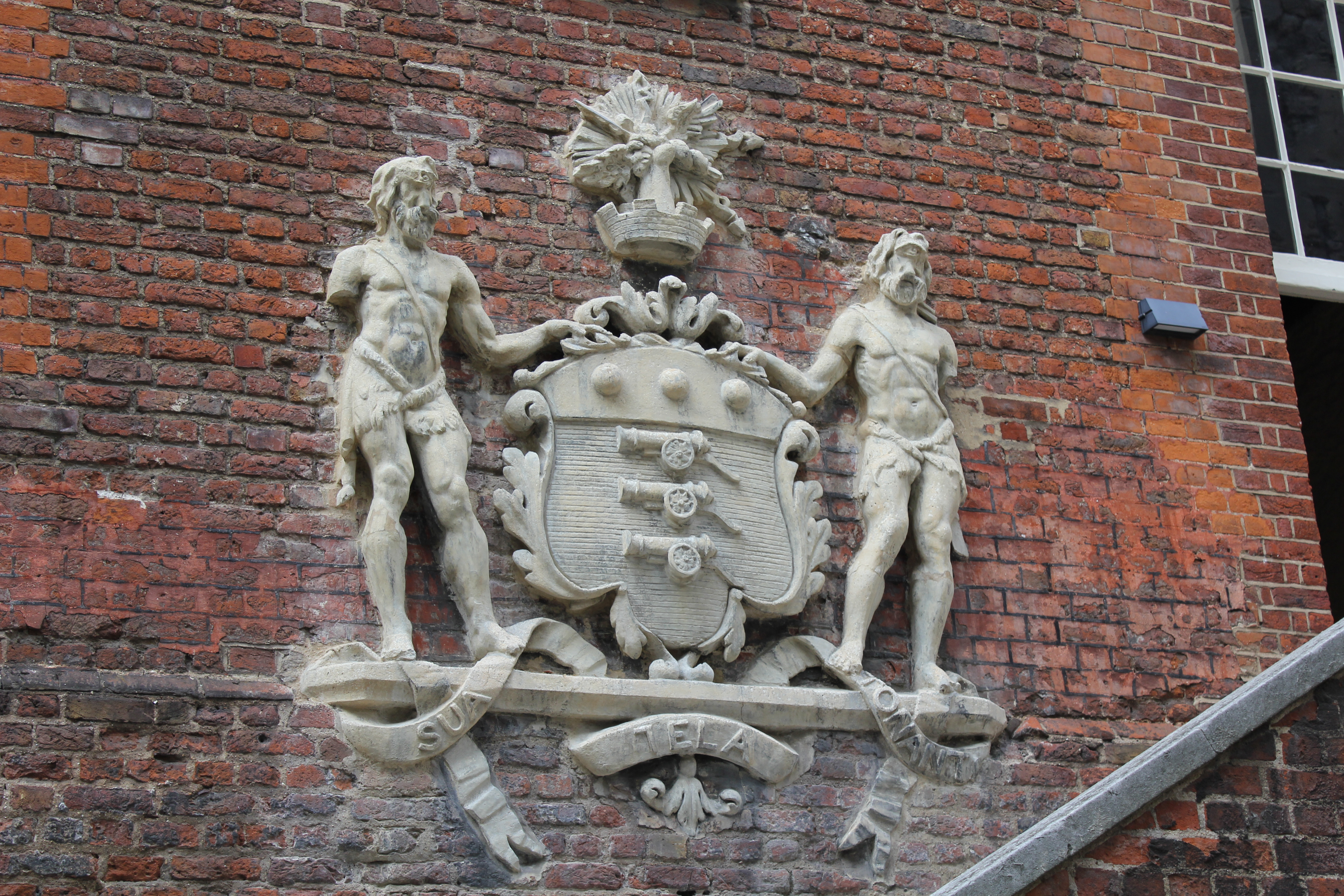
Full coat of arms, with crest and supporters, at the Tower of London

The Arms of the Board of Ordnance first appeared in the seventeenth century, and were given royal approval in 1806, confirmed by a grant from the College of Arms in 1823. The blazon is as follows:

- Arms: Azure - 3 Field Pieces in pale, or; on a chief, argent, 3 cannonballs, proper.
- Crest: Out of a mural crown, argent, a dexter cubit arm, the hand grasping a thunderbolt, winged and inflamed, proper.
- Supporters: On either side a Cyclops, in the exterior hand of the dexter a Hammer, and in that of the sinister a pair of Forceps, resting on the shoulder of each respectively, all proper.
- Motto: sua tela tonanti. ['To the thunderer his weapons'; also more loosely translated as 'To the warrior his arms'].

The old Board's coat of arms is remembered today in the cap badge of the Royal Logistic Corps, which has the shield at its centre (it was previously used, along with the Board's motto, by the Royal Army Ordnance Corps). The crest appears on the ensign of the Corps of Royal Engineers.

=== Broad Arrow ===
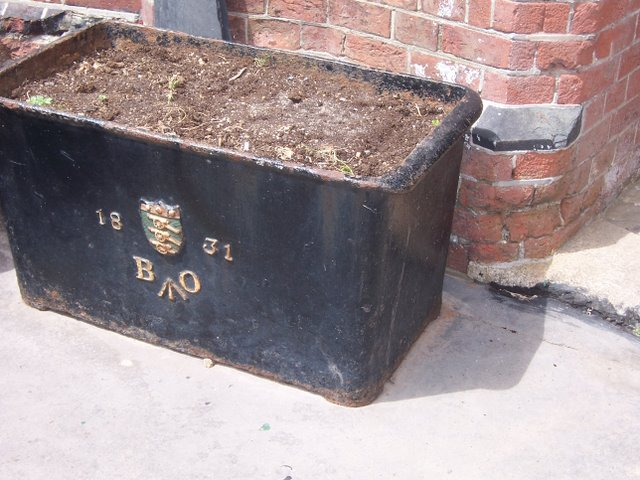
Coal box with the Board of Ordnance shield, initials and broad arrow.

The broad arrow was the Board's mark, used as such from the 17th century. Stamped on guns, papers, buildings and all kinds of equipment, it originally signified royal ownership. A proclamation of 1699 clarified its use on stores of war belonging to the Board of Ordnance; just over a hundred years later, in 1806, the Board directed its Storekeepers and others to mark "all descriptions of Ordnance Stores ... with the broad arrow as soon as they shall have been received as fit for His Majesty's Service".

=== The 'Ordnance Regiment' ===
In the 16th century, the Constable of the Tower of London routinely exercised his right (as ex-officio Lord Lieutenant of the Tower Hamlets) to summon local citizens to form a garrison to guard the Tower; by the early 17th century this had been formalised into a standing militia. During the reign of Charles II, the Tower was still consistently being guarded by two garrison companies of militia. Then in 1685, following Charles's death, the new King James II asked Lord Dartmouth (who was Constable of the Tower at the time, as well as Master-general of the Ordnance) to form a new Ordnance Regiment 'for the care and protection of the cannon': as well as guarding the stocks of guns, arms and ammunition in the Tower more effectively, it was envisaged that the new regiment would provide protection for the artillery trains, which were formed when necessary to deliver ordnance (e.g. to the battlefield at time of war). The old guard companies formed the core of this new regiment, but they were soon augmented by a further ten companies of 100 men each (again drafted from the Tower Hamlets); there was in addition a company of miners. The regiment was to be housed in the Grand Storehouse, then under construction in the Tower. As a precaution against the risk of igniting the Ordnance stores of gunpowder, it was equipped with modern flintlock fusils, rather than with the matchlock muskets borne by most other regular troops. As such, the King referred to it as 'Our Royal Regiment of Fusiliers'. In its formative years, the regiment accompanied the royal artillery train to Hounslow Heath each summer (where the Army remained encamped for several weeks); there they guarded the guns, and the gunners and matrosses who had been drafted in to operate them. In due course, after the Glorious Revolution of 1688, the Fusiliers ceased to be an Ordnance Regiment and became a regular Infantry regiment (the 7th Foot, later renamed the Royal Fusiliers (City of London Regiment)); but they continued to retain a base at the Tower. In 1949, the regimental depot (which had been located in Hounslow Barracks since 1873) returned to the Tower, to Waterloo Barracks (which had been built on the site of the old Grand Storehouse following a fire); it remained there for the next eleven years. Today, the Tower remains the Regimental Headquarters of the Royal Regiment of Fusiliers.

== Activities ==
=== Storage and supply: the Ordnance Yards ===
==== Headquarters: the Tower of London ====
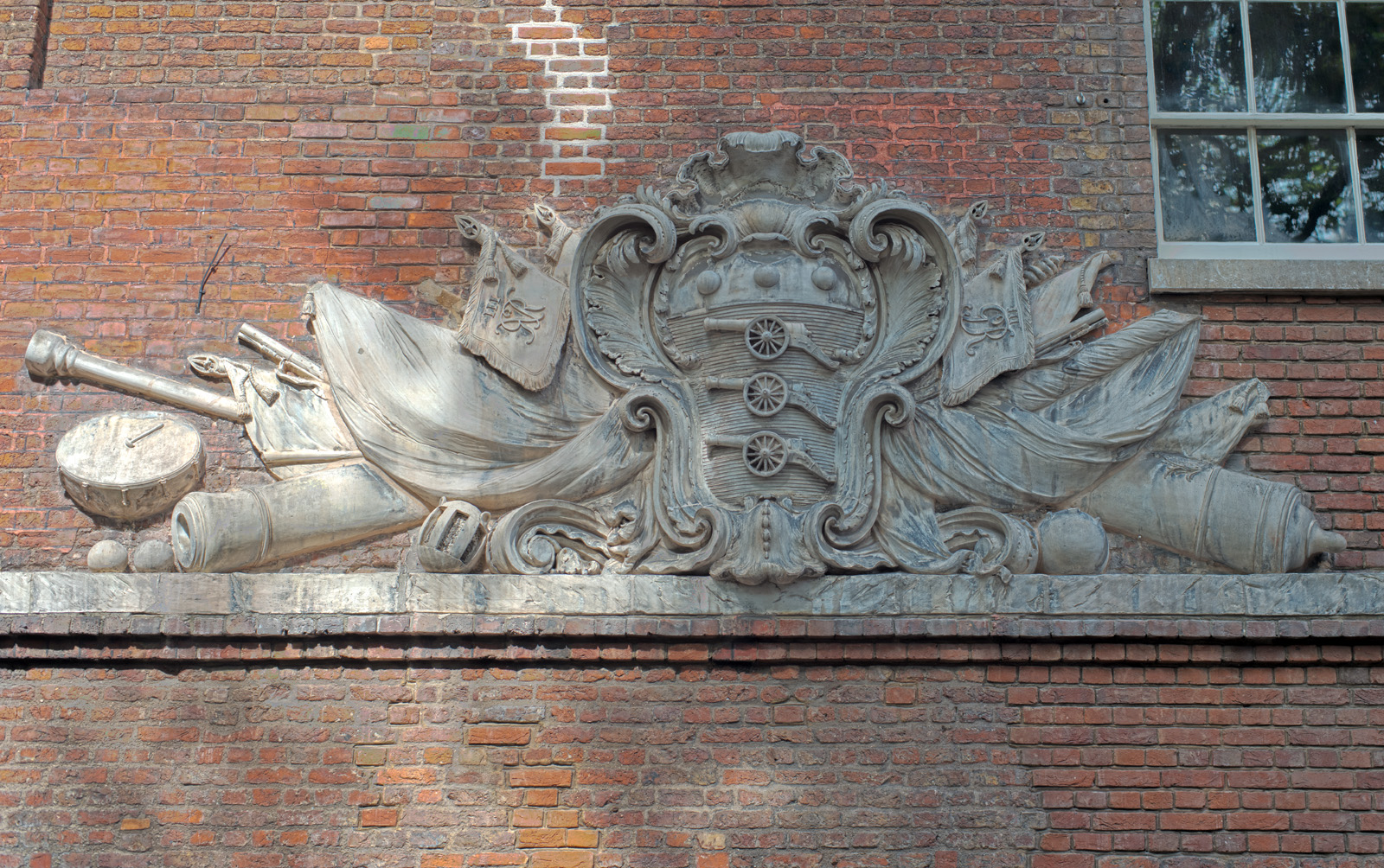
Arms of the Board of Ordnance at the Tower of London, New Armouries.

In the medieval period, storage and supply of weapons and armaments was the responsibility of the King's Wardrobe. Royal palaces (including the Tower of London) were therefore used for storage of armour, weapons and (in time) gunpowder. When the Office of Ordnance came into being, the Tower of London was already established as the main repository, and it remained the administrative centre of the new Board. Gunpowder was stored in the White Tower (and continued to be kept there until the mid-19th century). Small arms, ammunition, armour and other equipment were stored elsewhere within the Tower precinct, a succession of Storehouses and Armouries having been built for such purposes since the fourteenth century. From the mid-16th century bulkier items began to be stored in warehouses in the nearby Minories and cannons were proof-tested on the 'Old Artillery Ground' to the north.

Within the Tower, the New Armouries of 1664 served the Board as a small arms store (it can still be seen today in the Inner Ward). The vast Grand Storehouse of 1692 served not just as a store, but also as a museum of ordnance, precursor to today's Royal Armouries. (It was destroyed (along with its contents, some 60,000 objects) in a fire in 1841).

The Board's administrative staff had expanded during the Napoleonic Wars to such an extent that in 1806 it purchased the lease of Cumberland House in Pall Mall and moved its main offices there, subsequently expanding into neighbouring properties. The Board itself also began to hold its meetings there, in preference to the Tower or Woolwich or other locations where it had previously been accustomed to meet. At the same time the Tower, though still technically the Board's headquarters, was mostly given over to storage.

==== Central store depots: Woolwich and Weedon ====
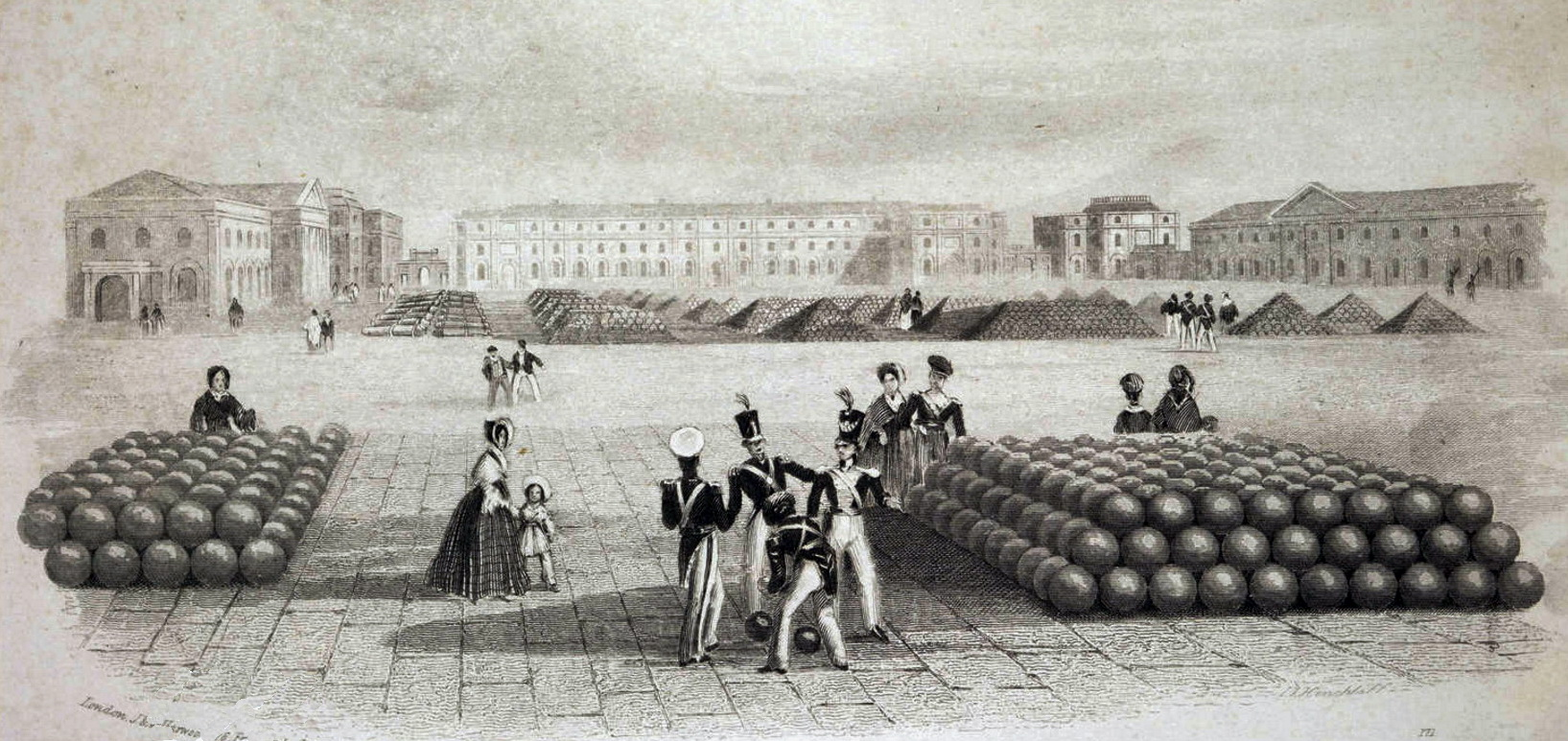
The Grand Store, Woolwich, in 1841: cannons and shot were routinely stored in the open, while gun carriages and other perishable items were kept indoors.

In the mid-17th century the Board began to use land at Woolwich for storing and proving its guns. The land (known as The Warren) was purchased in 1671 and in 1682 a thousand cannons and ten thousand cannonballs were transferred to Woolwich from the Tower and the Minories. At the same time, the Old Artillery Ground was sold and the staff and equipment involved in proof testing moved to Woolwich. From 1688 all new ordnance items were ordered to be delivered to Woolwich rather than the Tower (thereafter the Tower continued to be used as the Board's main repository for general stores).

The Woolwich Warren (later renamed the Royal Arsenal) continued to serve as Britain's principal ordnance depot until the mid-twentieth century. It also developed into a major manufacturing site (see below).

During the Napoleonic Wars, concerns were expressed about the vulnerability of the nation's ordnance stores to attack from the sea. One response was the establishment of a Royal Ordnance Depot at Weedon Bec, well away from the coast in Northamptonshire: a sizeable complex of storehouses and gunpowder magazines constructed along a waterway, it was connected to the Grand Union Canal to facilitate access and distribution. At the same time a similar (but short-lived) facility was also built alongside the Grand Junction Canal at North Hyde, west of London.

==== Distribution points: the Royal Dockyards ====
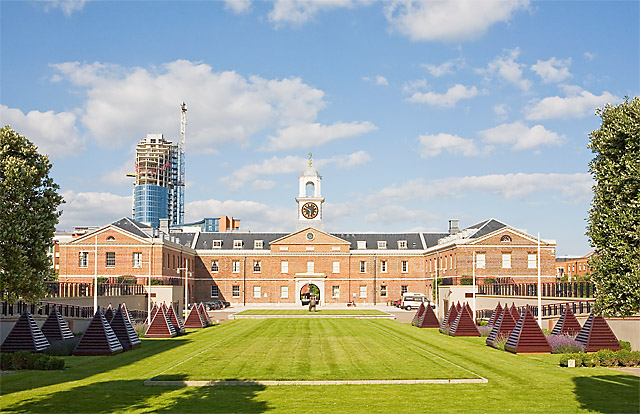
Part of the former Ordnance Yard at Portsmouth

The Board established storage and maintenance areas close to the Royal Dockyards to enable easy transfer of guns, ammunition, powder, etc. on board ships (for use by the Navy at sea or for delivery to the Army in areas of conflict). They also provided ordnance supplies for the defensive fortifications of the Dockyard itself, and secure storage space for ships in port (Royal Naval ships returning from duties at sea were obliged to unload their stores of powder and ammunition; if a ship was to spend time 'in ordinary' (i.e. out of commission) it had its guns removed as well).

In the 16th century the Ordnance Office had established 'annexes' in Chatham, Deptford and Woolwich; others were to follow in the vicinity of the other major Dockyards. These facilities, generally known as Gun Wharves, developed into purpose-built Ordnance Yards in the course of the 18th century. Built alongside deep-water quays, they usually comprised an assortment of buildings for storage, administration blocks, workshops (for woodwork, paintwork and metalwork) together with accommodation for officers, usually built around a central Grand Storehouse (primarily used for gun carriages). Exterior courtyards were laid out for the storage of cannonballs.

The principal home Yards included:

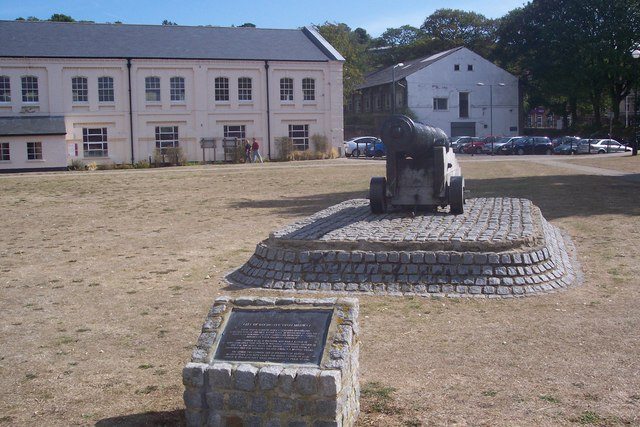
Some of the few surviving buildings of Chatham Gun Wharf

- HM Gun Wharf, Chatham
- Morice Yard, Devonport (replaced an earlier gun wharf just east of Mount Wise)
- Gunwharf, Portsmouth
- Gun Wharf, Sheerness
- Gun Wharf, Woolwich. (In the late 17th century Woolwich Gun Wharf expanded to the east, where it developed into the Royal Arsenal: a key Ordnance Board facility.)

Smaller Yards were built in parts of Britain to serve particular strategic purposes at particular times (such as the Yard in Great Yarmouth, built to service the fleet stationed in Yarmouth Roads during the Napoleonic Wars).

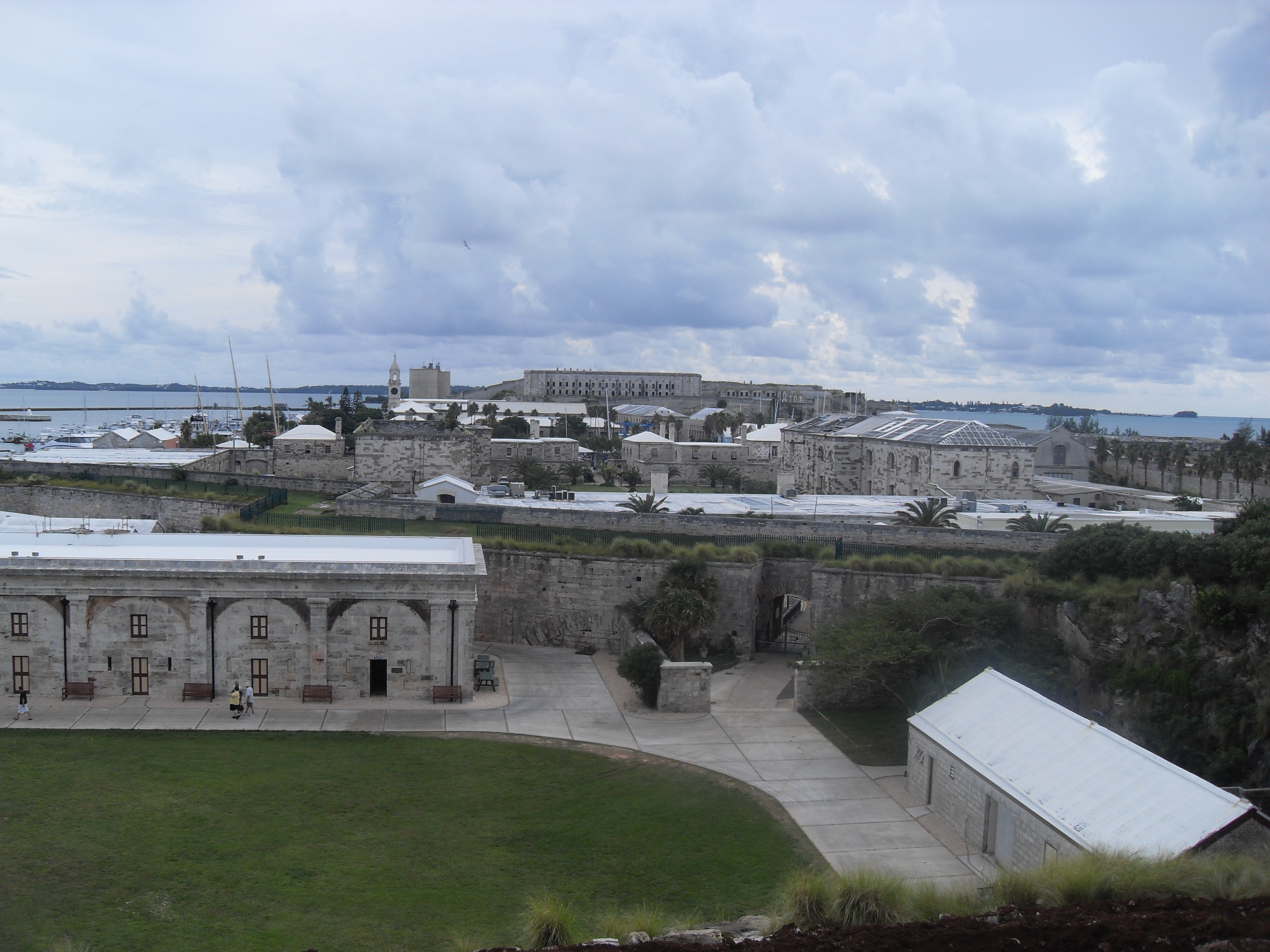
Part of Bermuda's Ordnance Yard within the bastioned defences of Keep Yard; other Dockyard buildings lie beyond.

Ordnance Yards were also constructed in colonial ports overseas; like their counterparts in Britain, these were usually built in the vicinity of naval dockyards. Bermuda's, begun in the 1830s, remains largely intact behind the dockyard fortifications; its magazines and storehouses are arranged around a small pool, where boats would arrive by way of a tunnel through the ramparts to be loaded with ammunition.

==== Gunpowder storage ====
For storage of gunpowder, a nearby fortified building was often used initially: the Square Tower at Portsmouth, the Citadel at Plymouth, Upnor Castle at Chatham; later, the Ordnance Board created purpose-built Gunpowder Magazines, often apart from the Yards, and at a safe distance from inhabited areas. There were also smaller magazines, supervised by Ordnance Board staff, at several fortified locations around the British Isles (from Star Castle on the Scilly Isles, to Fort George near Inverness).

The Tower of London remained the main, central repository until 1694, when a new gunpowder depot was established on the banks of the Thames at Greenwich Peninsula. The location was chosen both for reasons of safety (it was largely uninhabited marshland) and for convenience (because gunpowder barrels were invariably delivered by boat). The powder arrived at Greenwich from the manufacturers. Once there it was not only stored, prior to being despatched to wherever it might be needed, but a sample from each batch was proof tested. This took place in one of a pair of smaller buildings alongside and linked to the main magazine (which was a windowless quadrangle).

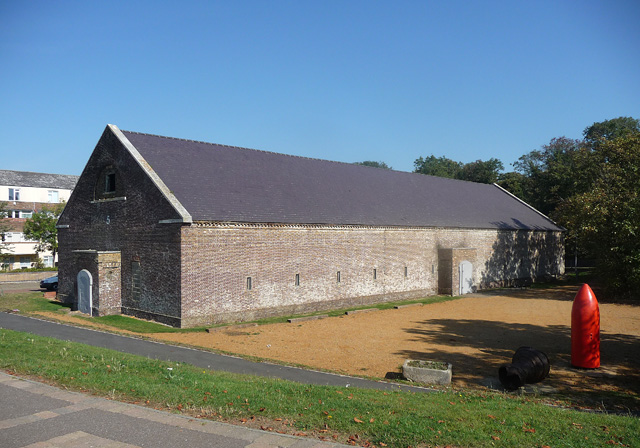
The Board's surviving former magazine at Purfleet.

Very soon, however, the Board was coming under pressure from local residents to remove the gunpowder store from Greenwich. Eventually, in 1763, a new set of magazines was built, along with a new proof-house, further downriver at Purfleet. Named the Royal Gunpowder Magazine, it was likewise used as a central store, to receive and approve gunpowder from the manufacturers prior to distribution around the country. (Soon afterwards the Greenwich magazine closed, and it was later demolished.)

At around the same time, significant improvements were made to the gunpowder depots at the Dockyards (where the Board was still often using old buildings in built-up areas). New purpose-built storage facilities were constructed close to the principal Dockyards at Portsmouth (Priddy's Hard) and Devonport (Keyham Point), and at Chatham the Upnor facility was (eventually) expanded. These centres continued to grow, as the processes for refining and preserving gunpowder became more complicated and as new explosives began to be used, requiring their own storage and maintenance areas.

In 1850, Devonport's magazine depot was moved from Keyham to a new complex at Bull Point (where it was integrated with a nearby proofing and purifying facility) - this proved to be the last major construction project of the Board of Ordnance before its disestablishment.

==== Other items ====
The Board of Ordnance was responsible, throughout its existence, for supplying the Army and Navy with weapons and ammunition. Other items were provided by various other boards and agencies (or, in earlier times, by private contractors). From 1822, however, the Board was given responsibility for sourcing, storing and supplying a variety of other items for the Army, including tents and camp equipment (formerly the remit of the Army's Storekeeper-General) and 'barrack stores' (for which the Commissariat had been responsible since 1807). Later, in 1834, the Board inherited (also from the Commissariat) the task of providing food and 'fuel' (namely coal and candles for use in barracks) for all homeland troops, as well as forage for cavalry regiments.

=== Manufacture: the Ordnance Factories ===
Prior to the 18th century the Board had generally relied on private contracts for the provision of armaments: small arms often came from the Birmingham Gun Quarter, gunpowder from Faversham (also, later, from Waltham Abbey). Cannons and shot were procured from iron foundries (initially those in the Kent and Sussex Weald, later from further afield, e.g. from the Carron Works in Falkirk). More expensive 'brass' (bronze) ordnance was produced on a smaller scale, by specialist foundries mostly in the London area (in Houndsditch, Vauxhall, Southwark, at The Foundery in Moorfields and elsewhere). In time, the Board made moves to set up or purchase its own facilities.

==== Artillery manufacture ====
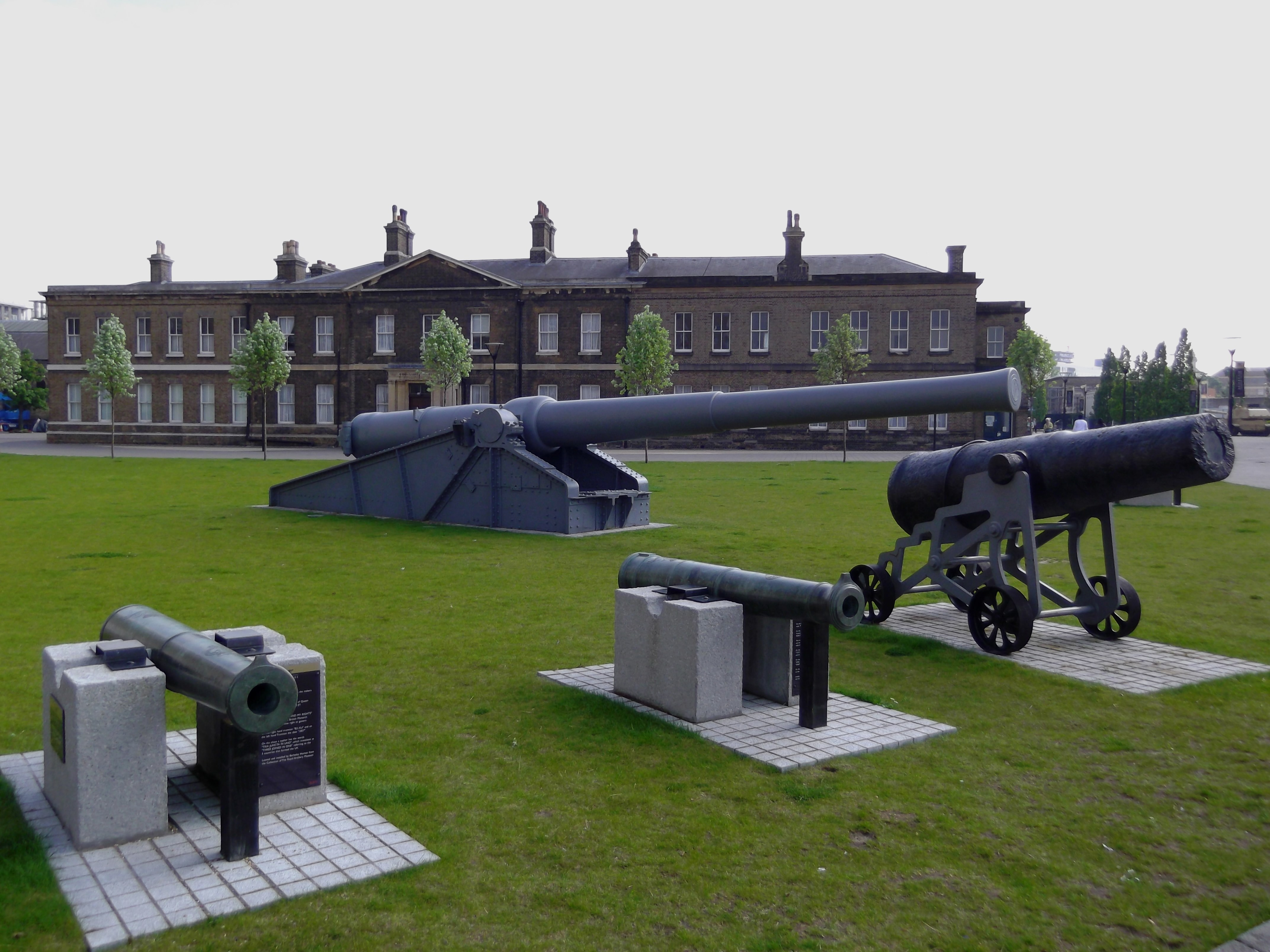
Guns of various ages displayed at the former Royal Arsenal site

The Board's primary manufacturing site, and a key location for several of its activities, was the Royal Arsenal in Woolwich. Guns had been stored and proved there from the mid-17th century. It later expanded into a large-scale production facility, specializing in:

- manufacture of shells, projectiles and propellants (Royal Laboratory, established at Woolwich in 1695, previously based at Greenwich)
- manufacture of cannons, mortars and other artillery pieces (Royal Brass Foundry (aka Gun Factory), founded 1717)
- manufacture of gun carriages and other ancillary items (1750s onwards; given identity as the Royal Carriage Works in 1803).

==== Gunpowder manufacture ====
Gunpowder manufacture was mostly kept separate of other operations (though some took place at Woolwich in the early years, inherited from the Wardrobe's earlier activities at Greenwich Palace). Beginning in the 18th century, the Board began to purchase mills that had been established under private ownership:

- Faversham became the Royal Powder Mill in 1759
- Waltham Abbey became the Royal Gunpowder Factory in 1787
- In Ireland, the Ballincollig Royal Gunpowder Mills were purchased in 1805, having been set up as a private enterprise ten years earlier.

Ordnance Board activity at Ballincollig ceased in 1815; both it and Faversham were returned to private ownership in the 1820s-30s, but Waltham Abbey remained in Government hands until 1991.

==== Small Arms manufacture ====
Small arms manufacture was begun by the Board on Tower Wharf in 1804, before being moved to Lewisham (Royal Manufactory of Small Arms, 1807) and then transferring ten years later to Enfield (Royal Small Arms Factory, opened 1816). RSAF Enfield continued manufacturing until its closure in 1988. There is some indication that William Galloway, a gunsmith, produced long guns for the Tower's small arms office in the 1780s.

=== Forts and fortifications ===
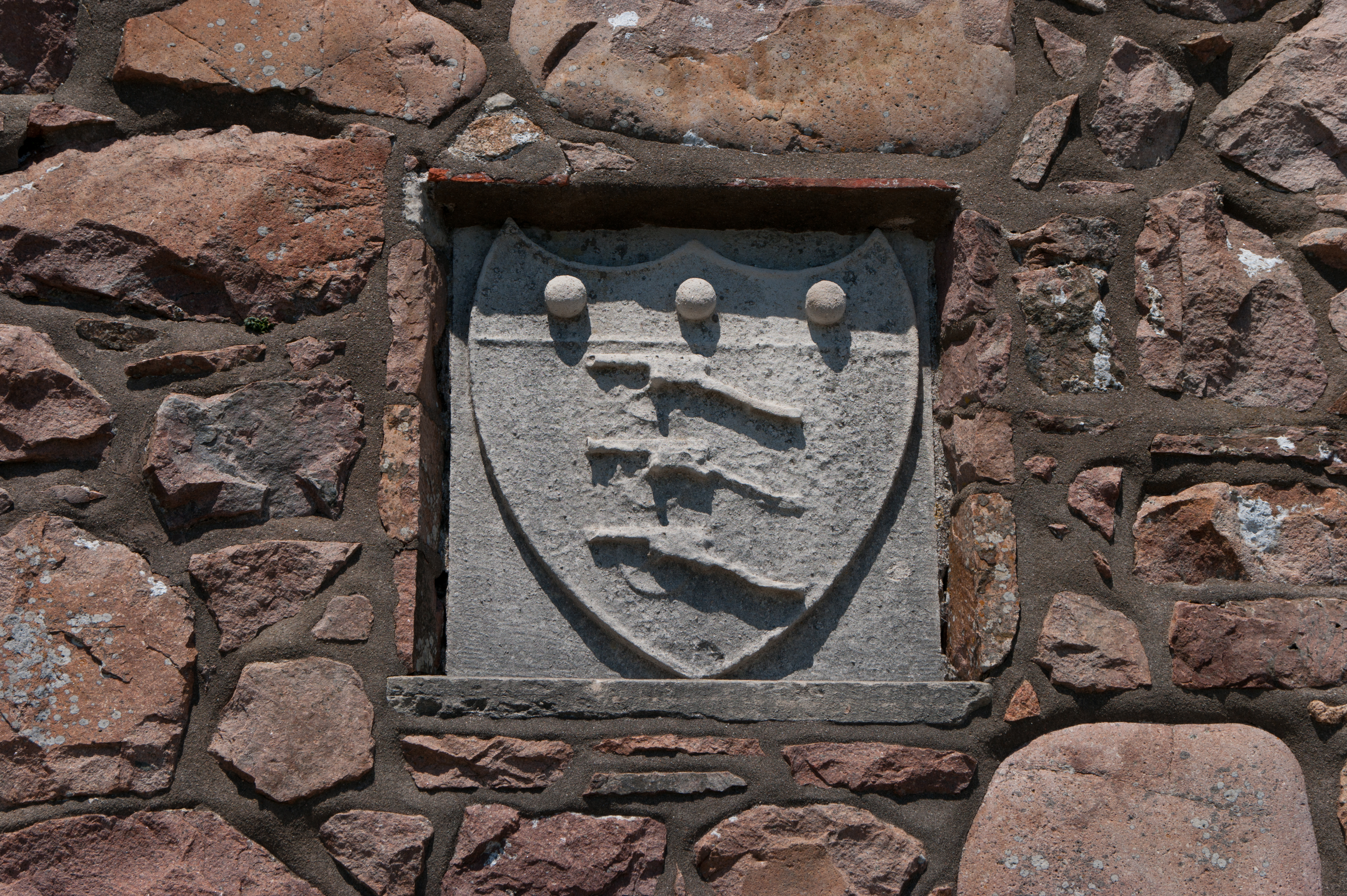
Board of Ordnance shield on part of Elizabeth Castle, Jersey

From the mid-17th century the Board of Ordnance began to be involved in the design, building and upkeep of forts, fortifications and various garrison buildings. Around the year 1635, a Francis Coningsby was appointed 'Commissary-General of all His Majesty's Castles in England and Wales'. From 1660 the title was Engineer-in-Chief. The Chief Engineer had responsibility for drawing up designs, supervising site surveys and building works, and visiting established defence sites to evaluate their state of repair, readiness etc. An illustrious holder of this post was Sir Bernard de Gomme. In 1802 the post of Inspector General of Fortifications was established, and this official took over supervision of these works.

==== Barracks ====
The Board also had responsibility for the building, upkeep and management of barracks and associated structures (except during a 30-year period, 1792-1822, when responsibility was transferred to a separate Barrack Office). Before this time, barracks were a rarity in mainland Britain and (other than those attached to royal residences) they were generally only found within garrisoned fortifications. In the wake of the French Revolution, however, there was a spate of barrack building and the new post of Barrackmaster-General was established to oversee it; he was answerable not to the Board of Ordnance but to the Secretary at War. (The Board, though, retained responsibility for providing and provisioning barracks for its own corps). Apparent mismanagement in the Barrack Office led to a series of inquiries, however, and following the Napoleonic Wars responsibility for barracks was returned to the Board of Ordnance.

=== Personnel: the Ordnance Corps ===
A number of different Corps were established by the Board of Ordnance to carry out its work both in its home establishments and on the field of battle; they had (and to some extent retain) a very distinctive identity and ethos. Principal among these were the Royal Artillery and the Royal Engineers. These Corps were under the authority of the Board of Ordnance, rather than the War Office (until the Board's demise in 1855). They were not part of the Army, and their officers' commissions were issued by the Master-General of the Ordnance rather than by the Commander-in-Chief of the Forces. The Ordnance Medical Department was established to provide surgeons for these corps.

==== Royal Artillery ====
In 1716 the Duke of Marlborough, in his capacity as Master General of the Ordnance, oversaw the formation (by Royal Warrant) of two permanent companies of field artillery, based (together with their guns) at the Warren (Royal Arsenal), Woolwich. Prior to this, artillery pieces had been conveyed to the front line in any conflict by ad hoc artillery trains (their personnel convened for a limited duration by Royal Warrant). The men of the new artillery companies (which became the Royal Regiment of Artillery from 1722) now provided troops for this purpose; before long, they were also providing guns and heavy artillery for forts and garrisons around the country and indeed across the Empire. In addition, the Artillerymen did on-site work at the Arsenal and at other Ordnance Board facilities, from preparing fuses and proving weapons to providing a guard. 1793 saw the formation of the Royal Horse Artillery (who were likewise under the authority of the Board of Ordnance) to provide artillery support to the Cavalry.

==== Royal Engineers ====
From the start, the Board (and its predecessor the Office) of Ordnance had had a department of military engineers and surveyors to build and improve harbours, forts and other fortifications. In 1716 a Corps of Engineers was founded by the Board of Ordnance, again at their Woolwich base. Initially an officer-only corps, the Engineers (called Royal Engineers from 1787) were engaged in the design, construction and ongoing maintenance of defences, fortifications and other military installations. They were also engaged for large-scale civilian projects from time to time. A civilian corps of 'artificers' provided the non-commissioned workforce of carpenters, stonemasons, bricklayers and other labourers; this corps was militarized in 1787, and named the Royal Military Artificers (they were then renamed the Royal Sappers and Miners 25 years later). The year after the demise of the Ordnance Board, the Sappers and Miners were fully amalgamated into the Royal Engineers, and at the same time the Corps moved from Woolwich to its present headquarters in Chatham.

==== Other corps ====
A Field Train Department was established in 1792 to serve as 'the field force element of the Board of Ordnance Storekeeping system'; staffed by uniformed civilians, the Department had oversight of the supply and provision of small arms, ammunition and other armaments to all front-line troops. After the Board's demise, the Ordnance Field Train was consolidated, together with the Ordnance Storekeepers and others, into a new Military Store Department, which eventually formed a key part of the Royal Army Ordnance Corps.

In 1796 a Corps of Royal Artillery Drivers was raised (separate from the Royal Artillery itself) to provide horses and drivers for conveying the field guns from place to place. (Before this time civilian drivers were used and horses either requisitioned or hired on contract). In 1822 the Corps of Drivers was fully amalgamated into the Royal Artillery.

The Corps of Royal Military Surveyors and Draftsmen was a military corps under the Board of Ordnance, formally established in 1800 and disbanded in 1817. It supported the work of the Ordnance Survey; after 1824 these duties were undertaken by Survey Companies of the Royal Corps of Sappers and Miners. Both corps were overseen by officers of the Royal Engineers in this work.

The Ordnance Medical Department was formed in 1801 (prior to this date medical officers were included on the establishment of the Royal Artillery). It was overseen by the Inspector General of Ordnance Hospitals, based at the Royal Artillery Hospital, Woolwich, who made recommendation for the appointment and promotion of medical officers, issued them with instructions and guidance, and had oversight of the management of Artillery Hospitals (of which there were eighteen Great Britain in 1810, and others in Ireland). Initially set up as 'the Medical Establishment for the Military Department of the Ordnance', its remit was extended to cover 'the Military and Civil Departments of the Ordnance' in 1814. In 1853 it was merged into the Army Medical Department.

In 1796 Edward Coleman was appointed Veterinary Surgeon to the Board of Ordnance. He oversaw the training and appointment of more veterinary surgeons to provide for the needs of Artillery and Engineer horses; and in 1805 he supervised the setting up of a Veterinary Establishment in Woolwich (later named the Royal Horse Infirmary) which functioned as a hospital, veterinary store and centre of veterinary research. After the Crimean War, it became de facto headquarters of the emergent Army Veterinary Department.

=== Education and training ===
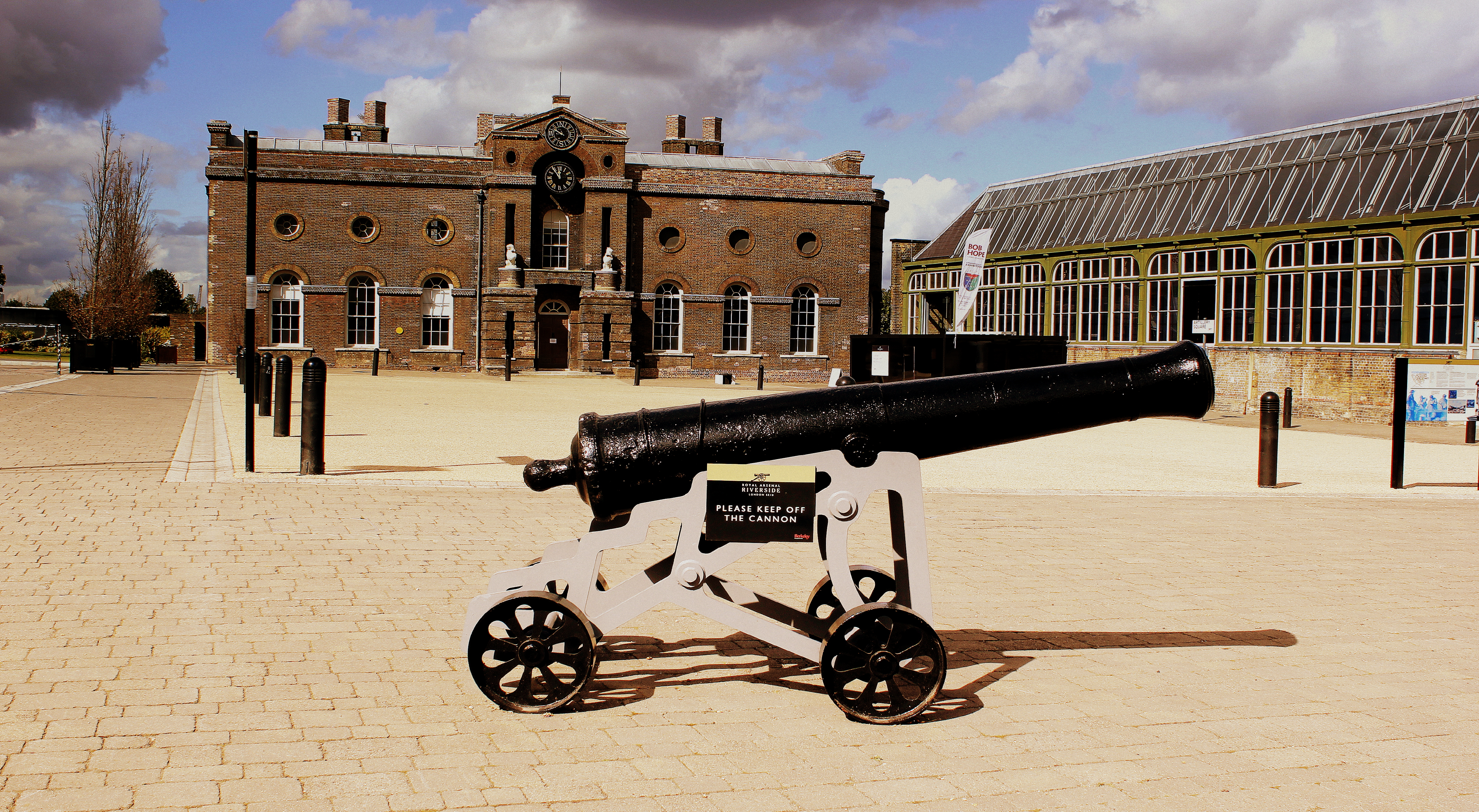
The original Royal Military Academy building in Woolwich Arsenal; it also contained a Board Room for meetings of the Ordnance Board itself.

The Board of Ordnance placed a high value on providing its future officers with a scientific and military education. In the eighteenth century there was no requirement for would-be Army officers to receive any formal military education; but the Board, in contrast, moved fast (after the establishment of its artillery and engineer corps) to provide for the education of its officer cadets. The Board was also ahead of the Army in its provision of advanced training for officers.

==== The Royal Military Academy ====
In 1720 there were moves to set up an 'academy' within the Warren at Woolwich where the corps were based; and on 30 April 1741 the Academy was formally established there by Royal Warrant. The fact that the Warren itself was a place of scientific experiment and innovation no doubt helped form the style of education that emerged. Initially, it was a gathering of 'gentlemen cadets', brought together to learn 'gunnery, fortification, mathematics and a little French'. By 1764, the institution had been renamed the Royal Military Academy, and in the words of the Survey of London, 'it became a uniquely enlightened establishment in which training comprehended writing, arithmetic, algebra, Latin, French, mathematics, fortification, together with the attack and defence of fortified places, gunnery, mining and laboratory-works [...] along with the gentlemanly skills of dancing and fencing'. In time, the Academy outgrew its original home in the Arsenal, and in 1806 it moved into new headquarters on Woolwich Common. In 1946 it amalgamated with the Royal Military College to form the Royal Military Academy Sandhurst.

==== Specialist training ====
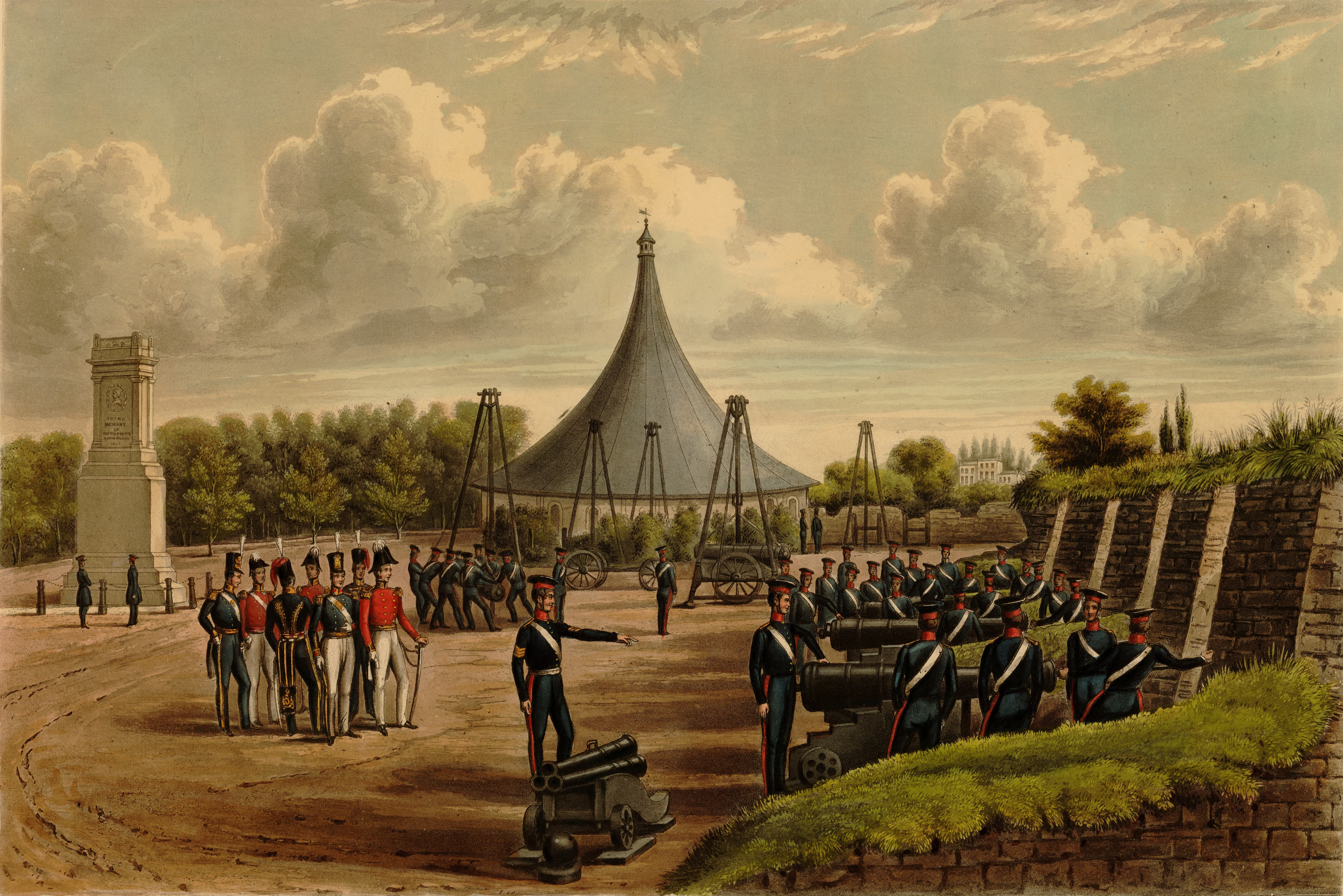
Repository training, Woolwich Common, 1844.

The Royal Military Repository was established, also within the Warren, in 1778 to provide practical, theoretical and historical training in gunnery, both for officers and other ranks; it too moved to Woolwich Common in the early 19th century. The Royal Engineer Establishment was established by the Board in Chatham in 1812, to provide advanced training for its Engineer officers; it was subsequently renamed the School of Military Engineering.

=== Other activities ===
==== Mapmaking: the Ordnance Survey ====
As part of its duty of maintaining and building harbours and fortifications, a department of the Board was in place to undertake surveys and to produce maps. This department developed into the Ordnance Survey, which remains in place today as Britain's national mapping agency. The principal offices and drawing room of the Survey were in the Tower of London; this not only accommodated surveyors and draughtsmen, but also functioned as a place where cadets (some as young as eleven or twelve) were trained in mathematics and draughtsmanship by leading practitioners. In 1841 a fire prompted the Survey to move to new premises in Southampton; following the demise of the Board, it became part of the War Department.

==== The Geological Survey ====
The Ordnance Geological Survey, the world's first national geological survey, was established by the board in 1835; ten years later, under the terms of the Geological Survey Act 1845 (8 & 9 Vict. c. 63), responsibility for the survey passed from the Board to the Office of Woods, Forests, Land Revenues, Works and Buildings. Known since 1984 as the British Geological Survey, it remains active as a national research and advisory body.

==== The Global Magnetic Survey ====
In 1839 the government gave its support to Major (later Sir) Edward Sabine for the establishment of four fixed magnetic and meteorological observatories in different parts of the world: one in Hobarton, one in Cape Town, one on Saint Helena, one in Toronto. The first would be overseen by Admiralty, staffed by officers of the Ross expedition; the other three were to be staffed by Artillery officers, under the authority of the Board of Ordnance. Sabine's intention was to undertake a global survey of terrestrial magnetism. Once the observatories were established, measurements were taken every two hours, day and night, at precisely the same moment in all four stations; the results were then conveyed to Sabine at his Magnetic Office in the Royal Artillery Institution Observatory at Woolwich. Measurements continued for three years at Hobarton, six years at Cape Town and Saint Helena, and nine years at Toronto. After this, the observatories (apart from Saint Helena's, which was dismantled) were handed over to the respective local governments; that in Toronto went on to becoming the Toronto Magnetic and Meteorological Observatory. In England, Sabine maintained his Magnetic Office at the observatory in Woolwich until 1871, when it moved to Kew Observatory.

==== The Royal Observatory, Greenwich ====
In 1675, the post of Astronomer Royal was established by royal warrant. The Board of Ordnance was warranted to pay the astronomer's salary, and also to construct a Royal Observatory in Greenwich. This has been called the first instance of government funding for science; money was to be provided from 'the sale of old or decayed gunpowder'. The Board of Ordnance continued to provide annual funding for the observatory until 1818, when the Admiralty took over this responsibility. Despite providing funds, the board was not in any way involved in the operational side of the observatory, which was managed independently by the Astronomer Royal under the governance of a board of visitors.

== Demise ==
Ordnance Board Transfer Act 1855 (Note: The citation of this act by this short title was authorised by section 1 of, and the first schedule to, the Short Titles Act 1896. Due to the repeal of those provisions it is now authorised by section 19(2) of the Interpretation Act 1978.)
- Act of Parliament
- Parliament of the United Kingdom
- Long title: An Act for transferring to One of Her Majesty's Principal Secretaries of State the Powers and Estates vested in the Principal Officers of the Ordnance.
- Citation: 18 & 19 Vict. c. 117
- Territorial extent: United Kingdom

Dates
- Royal assent: 14 August 1855
- Commencement: 14 August 1855 (Note: The Acts of Parliament (Commencement) Act 1793.)
Other legislation
Amended by	Defence (Transfer of Functions) (No. 1) Order 1964; Statute Law (Repeals) Act 1976; Requirements of Writing (Scotland) Act 1995; Land Registration etc. (Scotland) Act 2012

Status: Amended

Text of statute as originally enacted

Text of the Ordnance Board Transfer Act 1855 as in force today (including any amendments) within the United Kingdom, from legislation.gov.uk.

By the Ordnance Board Transfer Act 1855 (18 & 19 Vict. c. 117), the 'powers, authorities, rights and privileges' formerly vested in the Principal Officers of the Ordnance were transferred to 'Her Majesty's Principal Secretary of State for the War Department'. With this came responsibility for stores, land, contracts, surveys, defensive works and manufacturing, along with all their various associated personnel. The board's former offices in Pall Mall now became the headquarters of a newly-reconstituted and greatly-expanded War Office. The patents of the Master General, the Lieutenant-General and the Principal Storekeeper of the Ordnance were all revoked; and command of the Royal Artillery and the Royal Engineers was transferred, from the Master General of the Ordnance to the Commander-in-Chief of the Forces; both corps thenceforward became an integrated part of the British Army.

=== Background ===
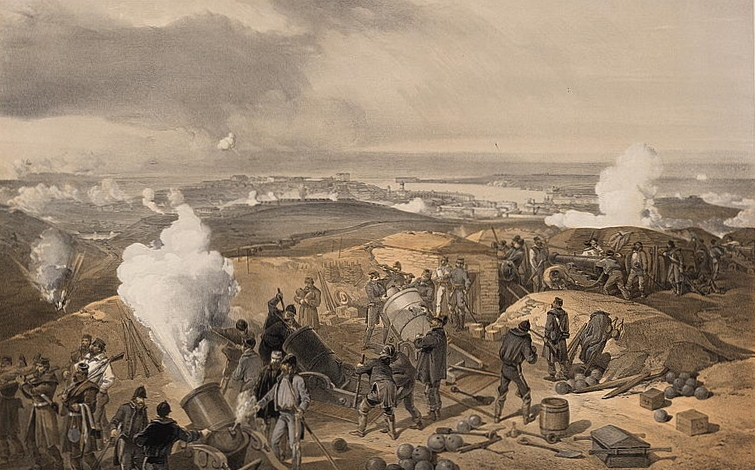
British artillery battery at Sebastopol by William Simpson, 1855. A colonel commented that a contemporary illustration depicted them 'dressed as we ought to be, not as we are ... we've neither the huts, fur hats, boots or anything in the picture'.

The catalyst for the board's disestablishment was the Crimean War. 'Disastrous logistical difficulties' plagued the campaign, especially during the Russian winter of 1854. These widely-reported failings led to the fall of the government in January 1855; its successor, under Lord Palmerston, wasted no time in embarking on a comprehensive reorganisation of military administration.

Well before Crimea, however, there had been moves afoot to reduce the board's sizeable influence and power. In 1830, the number of Principal Officers of the Ordnance had been reduced to four by the abolition of the posts of Lieutenant-General and Clerk of the Deliveries; arguably, this exacerbated the problems that led to the board's demise. Then, in 1833, a parliamentary Commission of Enquiry was set up to look into consolidating the civil departments of the Army and the Ordnance (another commission was set up with similar terms of reference two years later) but its recommendations were not carried through.

The causes of the logistical failings in Crimea were complex and remain the subject of some debate. Management of the British Army in the 1850s was chaotic, unwieldy and inefficient, with several different officials and establishments claiming and exercising the Sovereign's authority in relation to military matters, and no means of co-ordinating their functions, orders and activities. Furthermore, following forty years of relative peace, the army and its support services found themselves ill-prepared and ill-equipped for war: for example, responsibility for providing food, fuel and forage to troops overseas fell to the Commissariat (a branch of the Treasury which, in the years since Waterloo, had developed into an administrative division, unpractised in warfare); while the Army's land transport capability, the Royal Waggon Train, had been abolished as a cost-cutting measure in 1832.

At the time, much of the blame for failure fell on Field Marshal Lord Raglan, commander-in-chief of the British army in Crimea (who, ironically, died of dysentery there on 29 June 1855 at a time when his forces were afflicted with cholera and reeling from a disastrous series of military failures.):

(In 1855) . . . a loud outcry against Lord Raglan had begun in the press. He was charged with neglecting to see to the actual state of his troops, and to the necessary measures for their relief. Their condition was becoming more and more pitiable; their numbers dwindling rapidly from death and disease. The road between Balaclava and the camp had become a muddy quagmire, the few remaining horses of our cavalry were rapidly disappearing, every day the difficulty of getting up food and other necessaries from Balaclava was becoming more serious, and still no provision was being made for supplying an effective means of transport.

As well as commanding the army in Crimea, Lord Raglan also held the office of Master-General of the Ordnance at the time; his removal from the UK at the outbreak of war left a void in leadership at the head of the Board of Ordnance (which was compounded by the absence of the Surveyor-General of the Ordnance, who also went to Crimea). The post of Lieutenant-General of the Ordnance was therefore belatedly revived to try to fill the gaps, but its duties were left ill-defined.

Nevertheless, the Commander-in-Chief Lord Hardinge spoke positively of the board's contribution in his evidence to the 1855 Parliamentary Committee into the conduct of the Crimean War:

The Board of Ordnance had met the military difficulties of the situation with determination and success. Starting with the advantage of a well-trained and excellent personnel and reliable and sufficient materiel, they had faced the terrible losses of the winter of 1854 with resource and energy, and had lost no time in correcting the blunder of the absence of siege transport. Men and horses were quickly obtained and sent to the front, and, though every mistake in war demands an inevitable penalty, the military organisation did not fail under the heavy strain placed upon it. Nothing could exceed the military arrangements of the Ordnance Department.

Ultimately, the war in Crimea revealed failings across multiple departments compounded by confused structures of command and control; and the disestablishment of the Board of Ordnance became one of a series of wide-ranging military reforms which took place in the UK over the next half century.

=== Aftermath ===
Under the Secretary of State for War, a new Under Secretary was appointed in 1856 to take over the duties of the Clerk of the Ordnance (the one remaining Principal Officer, who had retained oversight of the board's civil staff in the interim following its disestablishment). Several directorates were formed: there was a Director General of Stores (successor to the old Principal Storekeeper, with responsibility also for barracks), a Director General of Contracts and a number of technical advisers: the Inspector General of Fortifications, Director General of Naval Artillery and Director General, Royal Artillery. In 1857, the network of Storekeepers and Clerks across various locations was reconstituted to form the Military Store Department. The Field Train remained operational alongside the Military Store Department for a short time, before being merged into it on 27 September 1859.

In Britain there was a longstanding (and at this time still lingering) suspicion of the idea of a standing army; so, although the Board of Ordnance troops (the Royal Artillery and the Royal Engineers) were merged into the Army and placed under the Commander-in-Chief, the Military Store Department (with its sizeable stocks of armaments and ammunition) remained under the civil oversight of the Secretary of State. Subsequently a series of organisational changes took place in an attempt to consolidate the various departments and responsibilities formerly pertaining to the Board of Ordnance, along with those of the Commissariat (which had likewise been absorbed by the War Office in 1855); this led in time to their amalgamation as part of the short-lived Control Department, before re-emerging as the Ordnance Store Department and the Commissariat and Transport Department (both of which evolved into military units in due course).

=== Ordnance Board in the twentieth century ===
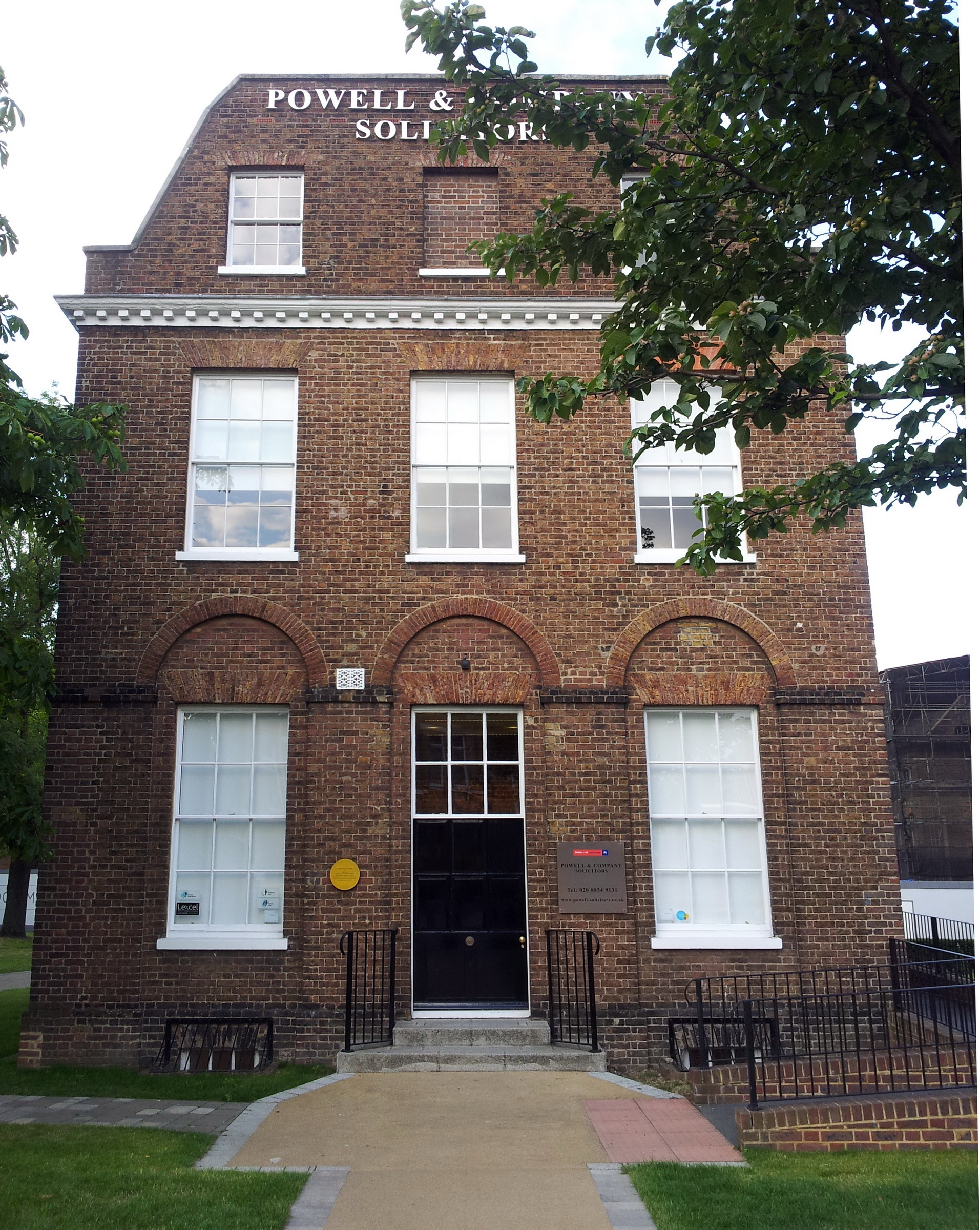
Verbruggen House in the Royal Arsenal: headquarters of the Ordnance Board/Committee until 1939.

Some fifty years after the old board's disestablishment, following unease after the Second Boer War that the British Army had been ill-equipped, a new body called the Ordnance Board was created within the War Office. It consisted of a committee of munitions experts, whose purpose was to advise the newly-formed Army Council on the safety and approval of weapons.

The new board had its origins in the Select Committee of Artillery Officers, formed by the old Board of Ordnance in 1805 'to assist in forming opinions on any inventions and suggestions of individuals, as likewise all improvements that may be proposed for the improvement of the Artillery Service'. After the demise of the Board of Ordnance, the Secretary of State for War revised and reconstituted the Ordnance Select Committee (this time including Naval representation). It continued to receive, report on and experiment with inventions or improvements submitted to the Secretary of State relating to arms and to gunpowder until 1869, when it was split into ten sub-committees overseen by a Council of Ordnance (an arrangement which caused confusion, and which fell into abeyance the following year in all but name).

In 1881 the 'Ordnance Committee' was re-formed, with an extended remit to approve designs for manufacture, in addition to considering inventions and conducting experiments. It was renamed the 'Ordnance Board' in 1908, having merged with the Ordnance Research Board. Further amalgamations prompted further name-changes: back to the 'Ordnance Committee' in 1915, (after which, for the duration of the First World War, it formed part of the Ministry of Munitions), and back again to the 'Ordnance Board' in 1939 (after which, for the duration of the Second World War, it formed part of the Ministry of Supply).

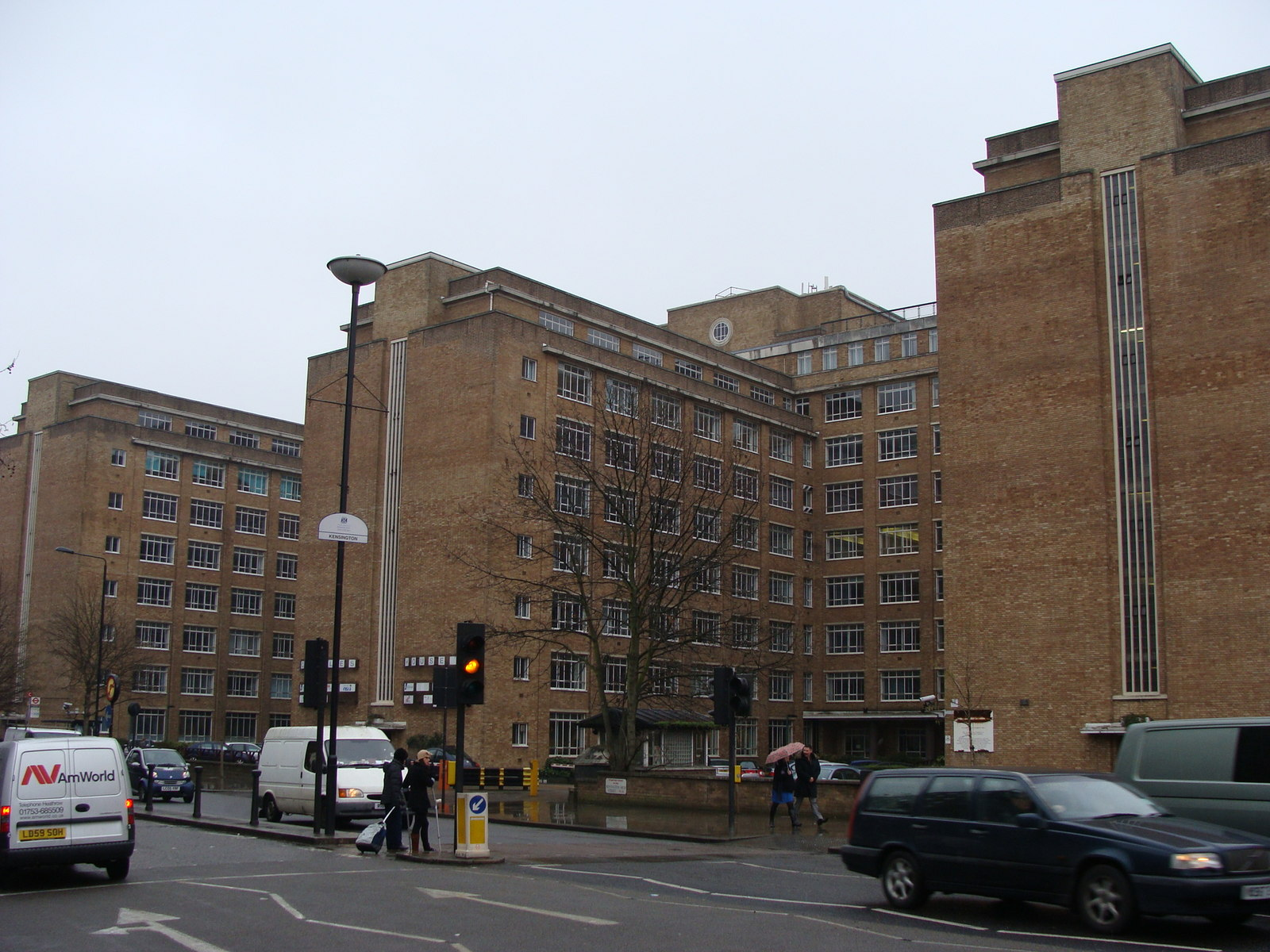
Charles House, Kensington: the board's headquarters from 1950.

Up until 1939, the Ordnance Board (like the Ordnance Select Committee before it) was based at the Royal Arsenal, in Verbruggen House. The board worked closely with the Proof and Experimental Establishment, the Research Department and the Design Department (which later amalgamated to form the Armament Research and Development Establishment) all of which were likewise based at the Royal Arsenal until 1939; it also had close links to the Inspection (or Quality Assurance) Department, which remained at the Arsenal into the 1990s.

At the outbreak of war, the Ordnance Board moved to Kemnal Manor in Chislehurst as part of the dispersal of departments from Woolwich; (in 1950 it moved again to Charles House on Kensington High Street). After the war, the Ordnance Board continued to provide independent authoritative advice on the development and design of weapons, ammunition and explosives; the positions of President of the Board and two Vice-Presidents were rotated between the three services.

The Ordnance Board and its name survived within the Ministry of Defence until the mid-1990s when it was renamed the Defence Ordnance Safety Group and later Weapons Technical Services.

== Notable staff ==
- One of its 18th-century map-makers was noted water-colour artist Paul Sandby (1731-1809).
- Captain George Manby FRS (1765-1854) author, inventor of the Manby mortar was also barrack-master of Great Yarmouth.
- John Wilson (1782–1866) was a Clerk of Works with the Board of Ordnance, and went to Guernsey to supervise work on the barracks at the garrison in around 1813. In the 17 years he spent there, he also took commissions as an architect from the local government and private individuals. He is best remembered today as the architect of many of the island's most iconic public and private buildings.

== See also ==
- List of Masters-General from 1415
- The Royal Artillery and the Royal Engineers, both of which were Board of Ordnance initiatives
- The Royal Military Academy, Woolwich, set up by the Board to train and educate its officers
- Royal Ordnance Factories
- Ordnance Survey
- Ordnance yards and other facilities, including Gunpowder magazines
- Tower of London, headquarters of the Board
- Woolwich Royal Arsenal (a key Ordnance facility)
- Broad arrow
- Anthony Roll
