= Royal Corps of Military Surveyors and Draftsmen =

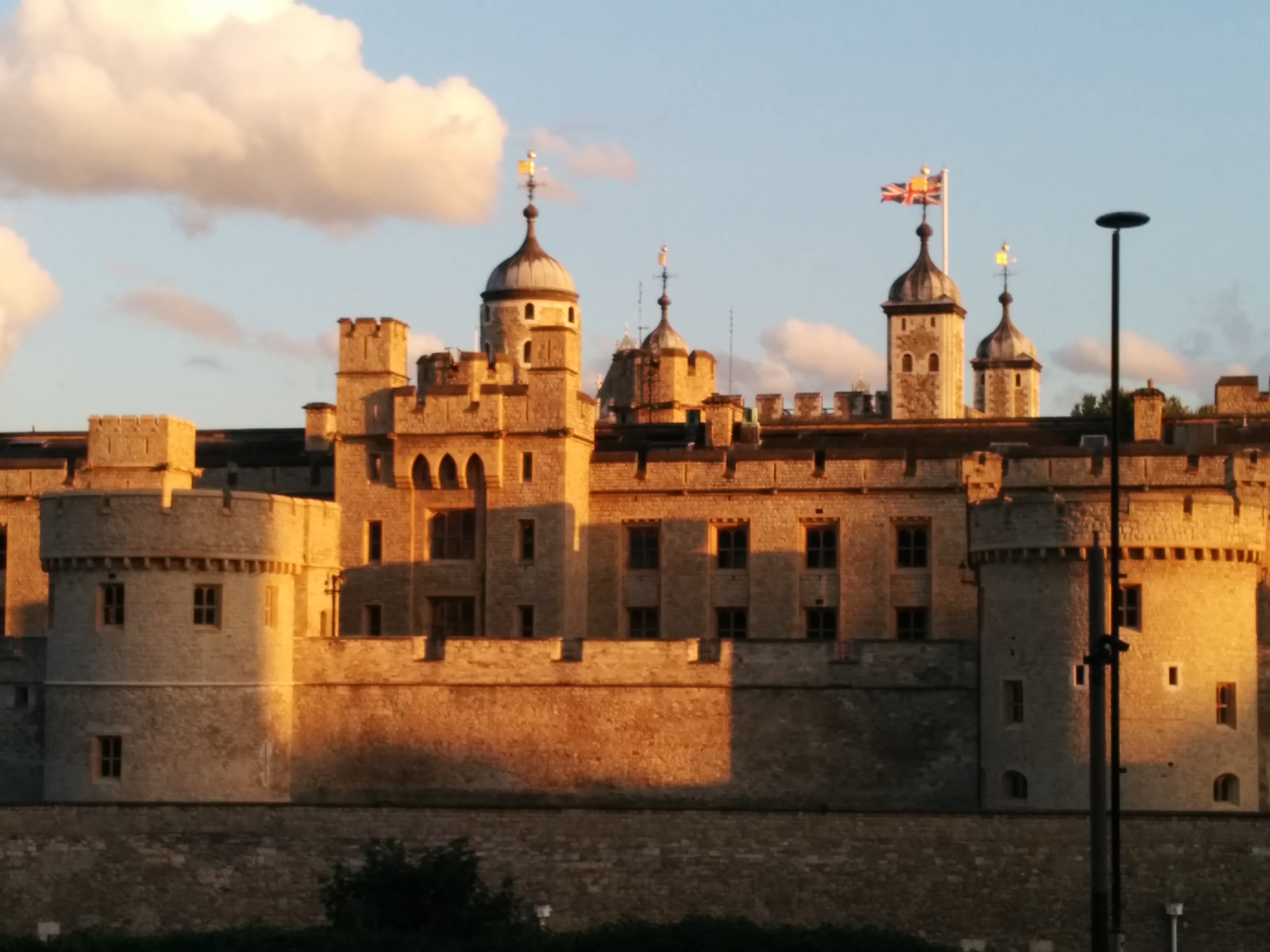
The Tower of London was home to the Board of Ordnance and the Royal Corps of Military Surveyors and Draftsmen.

Royal Corps of Military Surveyors and Draftsmen was a British military corps under the Board of Ordnance formally established in 1800 and disbanded in 1817. It was one of the predecessors of the Ordnance Survey.

== Establishment ==
The royal warrant to establish the corps was signed in 1800, making the civilian staff of the Drawing Room at the Tower of London a military corps. It was believed that a militarization of the staff would increase its efficacy. In reality, the corps was not formed until 1805. In 1813 it was confirmed by law that the corps as well as other corps of the military establishment of the Ordnance Board was subject to the Mutiny Act.

== Duties ==
Duties of the corps was to make surveys and drawings, both in Britain and abroad, particularly as part of the Trigonometrical Survey.

== Staff ==
- 1 Chief Surveyor and Draftsman
- 1 First Assistant Surveyor and Draftsman
- 1 Second Assistant Surveyor and Draftsman
- 8 Surveyors and Draftsmen 1st Class
- 16 Surveyors and Draftsmen 2nd Class
- 8 Surveyors and Draftsmen 3rd Class
- 6 Surveyors and Draftsmen Cadets

Each officer was appointed by a warrant from the Master General of Ordnance; the cadets being appointed by letter.

== Disbandment ==
The corps was disbanded in 1817 and its officers put on half-pay.
