= Henry MacLauchlan =

- Born: 26 April 1792; Landguard Fort in Felixstowe, Suffolk
- Died: 27 January 1882 (aged 89); Clapham, London
- Military career
- Allegiance: United Kingdom
- Branch: British Army
- Service years: c.1804 – 1824
- Units: Royal Corps of Military Surveyors and Draftsmen & The Ordnance Survey

Henry MacLauchlan (26 April 1792 – 27 January 1882) was a British military, geological and archaeological surveyor. Born into a military family, MacLauchlan studied surveying whilst a cadet at the Tower of London with the Royal Corps of Military Surveyors and Draftsmen. He left the corps when it disbanded in 1817 and joined the Ordnance Survey a few years later. After leaving the army, MacLauchlan worked with geologist Henry De la Beche on a survey of Cornwall and for the Duke of Northumberland to survey archaeology in the north of England. MacLauchlan died in Clapham in 1882.

== Early life and career ==
MacLauchlan was born at the British Army base of Landguard Fort in Felixstowe, Suffolk, to Andrew MacLauchlan, a storekeeper for the Board of Ordnance, and his second wife, Martha Haywood. After his father's death in 1795, MacLauchlan moved in with his mother's family in Chichester, before becoming, around 1804, a cadet with the Royal Corps of Military Surveyors and Draftsmen at the Tower of London. He spent several years with the army as a draughtsman in Cork, Ireland before the corps disbanded in 1817 and he was retired on half pay. MacLauchlan worked with the Ordnance Survey from 1823 to 1824, making surveys in Gloucestershire, South Wales and Bedfordshire.

== Geological and archaeological work ==
As well as surveying, MacLauchlan was interested in geology, being elected a fellow of the Geological Society in 1832 and being known to the geologists William Conybeare and George Bellas Greenough. In 1835 he was seconded to Henry De la Beche to provide geographical expertise for his geological survey of Cornwall. MacLauchlan returned to surveying in 1839, before retiring in November 1844.

Upon retirement MacLauchlan moved to Cornwall, where he surveyed hill forts and linear earthworks for the Assessionable Manors Commission. He published his findings in six papers in the annual reports of the Royal Institution of Cornwall between 1847 and 1853. By 1848 he was conducting a survey of the archaeology of the North Riding of Yorkshire on behalf of the Duke of Northumberland, an amateur archaeologist. His work in Yorkshire was completed in 1849 and published in the Archaeological Journal. The Duke then commissioned MacLauchlan to survey parts of Northumberland, including Watling Street and Hadrian's Wall, the results of which were published between 1850 and 1867.

== Later life ==
MacLauchlan was consulted in 1854 by a commission of the British Parliament which was investigating which scales should be used by the Ordnance Survey for mapping and how best to represent hills on maps. MacLauchlan recommended the use of shading to show hills, considering contour lines to be less informative and aesthetically pleasing.

MacLauchlan never married and, when not in the field surveying, resided in Lambeth or Clapham in London. He died at 14 Liston Road, Clapham on 27 January 1882. MacLauchlan was little known until the 1950s and 1960s, when scholars of pre-historic and Roman northern England acknowledged the value of his accurate work, especially in his derivation of place names.
