= Old Woolwich =

South East London neighborhood in England

Coordinates: 51.494081°N 0.062418°E

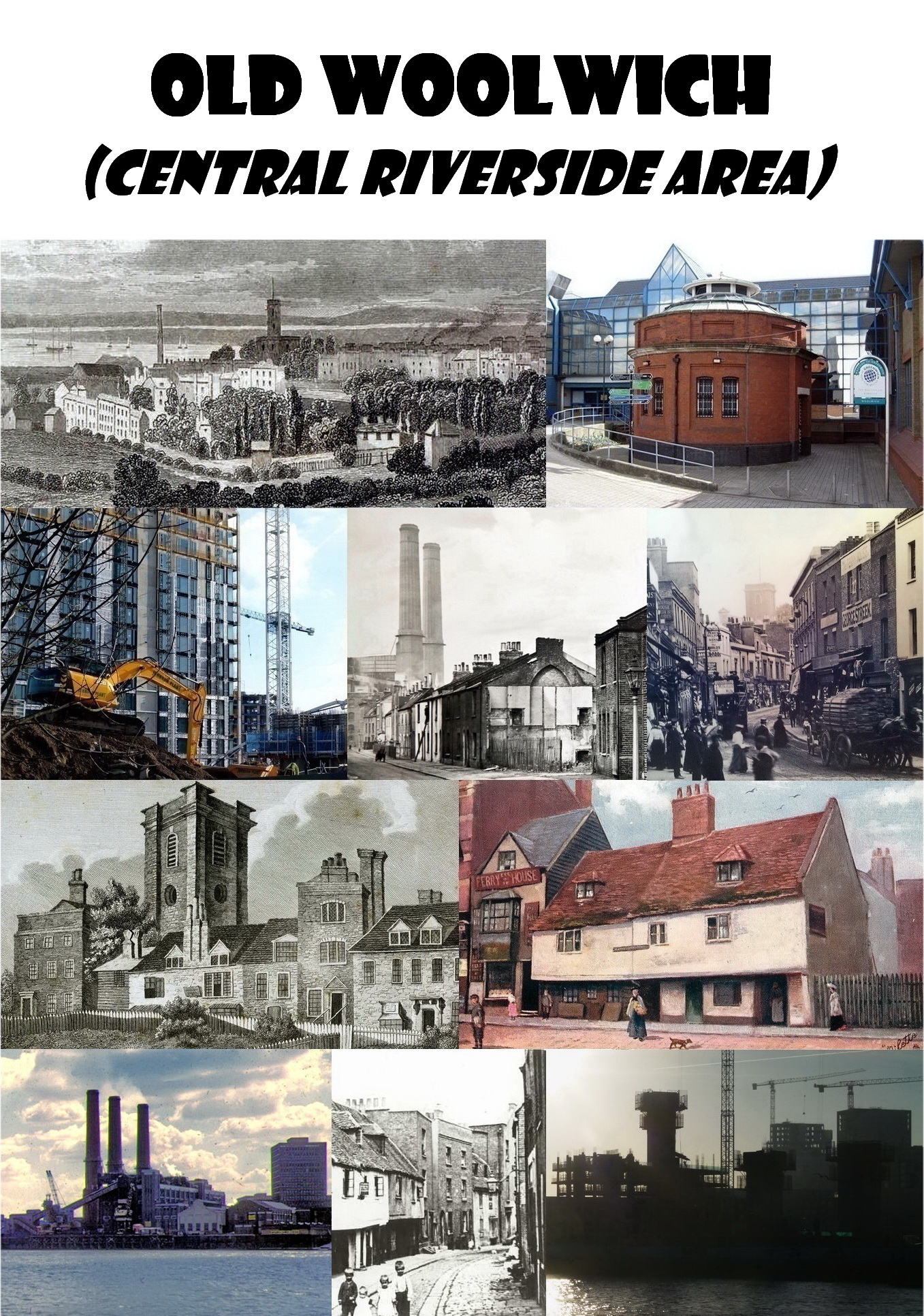
Woolwich Central Riverside. From left to right, top to bottom: Woolwich, c 1830; Woolwich foot tunnel & Waterfront Leisure Centre; Waterfront construction site, 2016; Ropeyard Rails demolition, 1950s; High Street, c 1900; Church Hill, 1809; Nile Street, c 1900; Woolwich Power Station, 1973; Woolwich Ferry approach, c 1888; construction sites, 2016

Old Woolwich or Woolwich Central Riverside (Note: Both these terms are potentially confusing as Old Woolwich may also refer to the present-day town centre, which is further south. Woolwich Riverside is also the name of an electoral ward constituting a much larger area. Volume 44 of the Survey of London (about Woolwich) uses the term Central Riverside Area.) is an area along the Thames in Woolwich, South East London. It is the oldest inhabited part of Woolwich, going back to an Anglo-Saxon riverside settlement. When the demographic centre of Woolwich shifted south in the 1800s, the area became a Victorian slum. Most of Old Woolwich was cleared in the 20th and early 21st centuries to make way for industrial, infrastructural and other large-scale developments. Although most of the earlier buildings have been demolished, the area has retained some interesting architecture, including the Georgian parish church, the Edwardian foot tunnel rotunda and two cinemas of the 1930s.

== Location ==
The area designated as Woolwich Central Riverside is situated along the south bank of the river Thames in Woolwich in the Royal Borough of Greenwich. It is bounded to the north by the Thames and to the south by Woolwich Church Street, Woolwich High Street and Beresford Street (all part of the A206 road), although some historic alleys and yards on the south side of these streets are included in this survey. To the west it is bounded by Woolwich Dockyard, and to the east by the Royal Arsenal. Old Woolwich is located north of the present-day commercial heart of Woolwich, which is centred around Beresford Square and Powis Street.

== History ==
=== Early history: riverside settlement ===
Woolwich Central Riverside has been inhabited at least since the 1st century BCE. Remains of Iron Age, probably Celtic fortifications were found at the current Waterfront development site between Beresford Street and the Thames. This was reused as a castrum or castellum in the late-Roman period. According to the Survey of London, "this defensive earthwork encircled the landward sides of a riverside settlement, the only one of its kind so far located in the London area, that may have been a significant port, anterior to London".

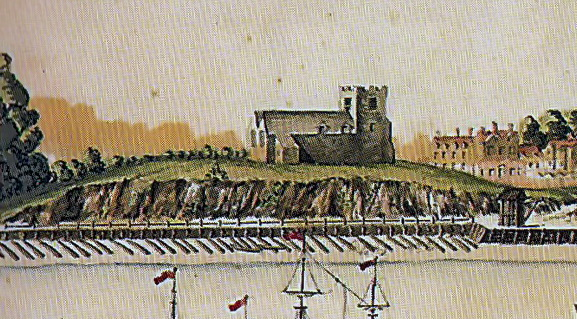
The Medieval parish church (1698)

The Anglo-Saxon name for Woolwich (uuluuich) indicates that this was a -wich town, a trading place for wool. In 2015, Oxford Archaeology discovered a Saxon burial site near the riverside with 76 skeletons from the late 7th or early 8th century. The absence of grave deposits indicates that this was an early Christian settlement. The first church, which stood to the north of the present parish church, was almost certainly pre-Norman and dedicated to Saint Lawrence. It was probably rebuilt in stone around 1100.

From the 10th till the mid-12th century Woolwich was controlled by the abbots of St. Peter's Abbey in Ghent. Some of the Ghent lands passed to the royal manors of Dartford and Eltham. Not included were a riverside quay held by Holy Trinity Priory, and a wharf held by St Mary's Priory, Southwark. Woolwich Ferry was first mentioned in 1308 but may be older. Several Medieval pottery kilns have been discovered north of Beresford Street in 2007-08. The oldest and best-preserved kiln probably produced so-called 'London ware' in the 14th century. (Note: London ware was arguably the most important pottery industry in south-east England between the 12th and 14th centuries, traded as far afield as Ireland, Scotland and Norway. It is best known for its plain and highly decorated jugs. The six kilns discovered at the 'Teardrop' site (between Beresford Street and Warren Lane) "testify, perhaps, to an unbroken tradition of pottery production at Woolwich from at least the 14th century until the 17th century". John Cotter, "Medieval London-type Ware Kilns Discovered at Woolwich". In: Medieval Pottery Research Group, newsletter 6, 1 August 2008, pp. 3-5 (PDF).) Around Bell Water Gate some private shipbuilding or repair may have existed in the 15th century. Very little is known about the size and disposition of the settlement. One or two houses from the 15th or 16th century survived until the late 19th century, long enough to be recorded by local antiquarians.

=== 16th-18th century: expansion ===
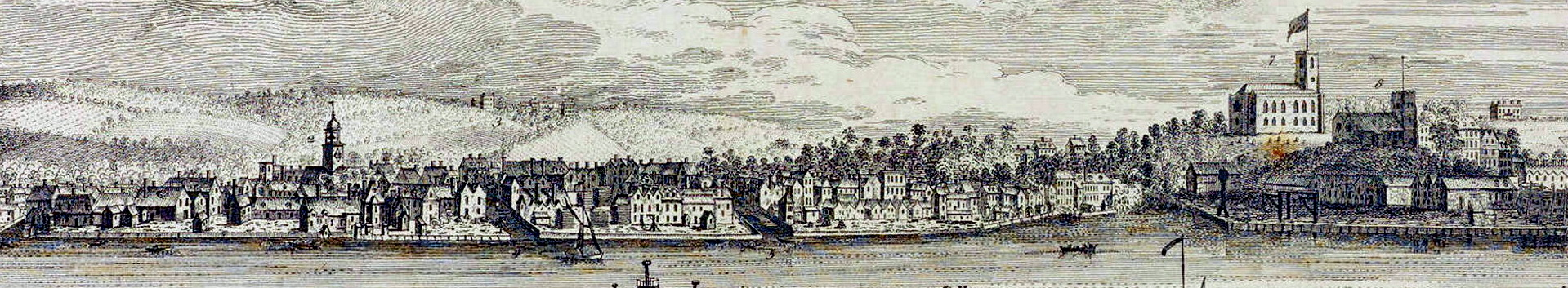
View of Woolwich (S. & N. Buck, 1739). To the left: the bell tower of the ropeyard. To the right: the old and new parish church

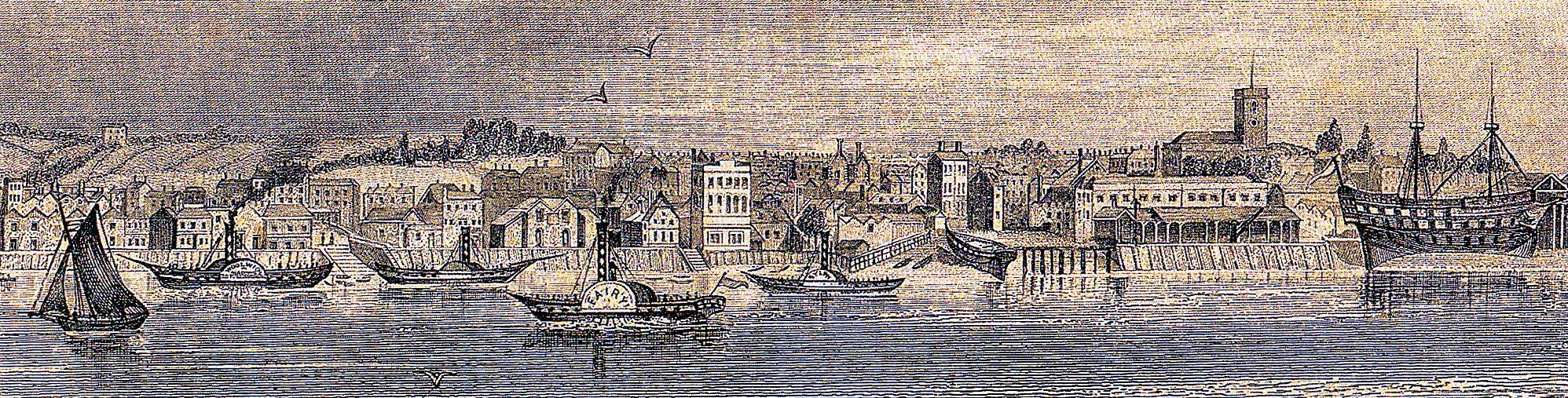
The riverfront a century later (R. Rixon, 1841). The ropeyard and old church have gone; the watermen's stairs are still in use

In 1512 a naval shipyard was established at Gun Yard, east of Bell Water Gate (now a car park next to the Waterfront Leisure Centre). Gun Yard or Gun Wharf may have been formed from two existing yards, Crane's Wharf and Daniel's Wharf, using about 80 meters of river frontage between Bell Water Gate and Globe Lane. In 1515 the Henry Grace à Dieu was built here, at the time probably the largest warship in Europe. Not long after this, in the 1540s, the naval yard moved to an area further west and became known as The King's Yard or Woolwich Dockyard. Gun Wharf continued to be used for naval storage. In 1573 the royal ropeyard was established, more or less where Beresford Street is situated now. The warehouse at Gun Yard may have been rebuilt in brick around the same time. A new crane and thatch-roofed workshop were added in 1586. Apart from naval storage, the wharf was used for bringing in raw materials for the ropeyard as well as shipping out finished rope. The north-west section of the yard was named Ropeyard Wharf. Hemp, tar and rope were carried or carted some 180 meters between this area and the ropeyard via Bell Water Gate and the High Street. At the intersection of these two streets stood the parish cage and stocks. Later this area was named Market Hill, after the market moved here around 1670 from its earlier location near the ropeyard.

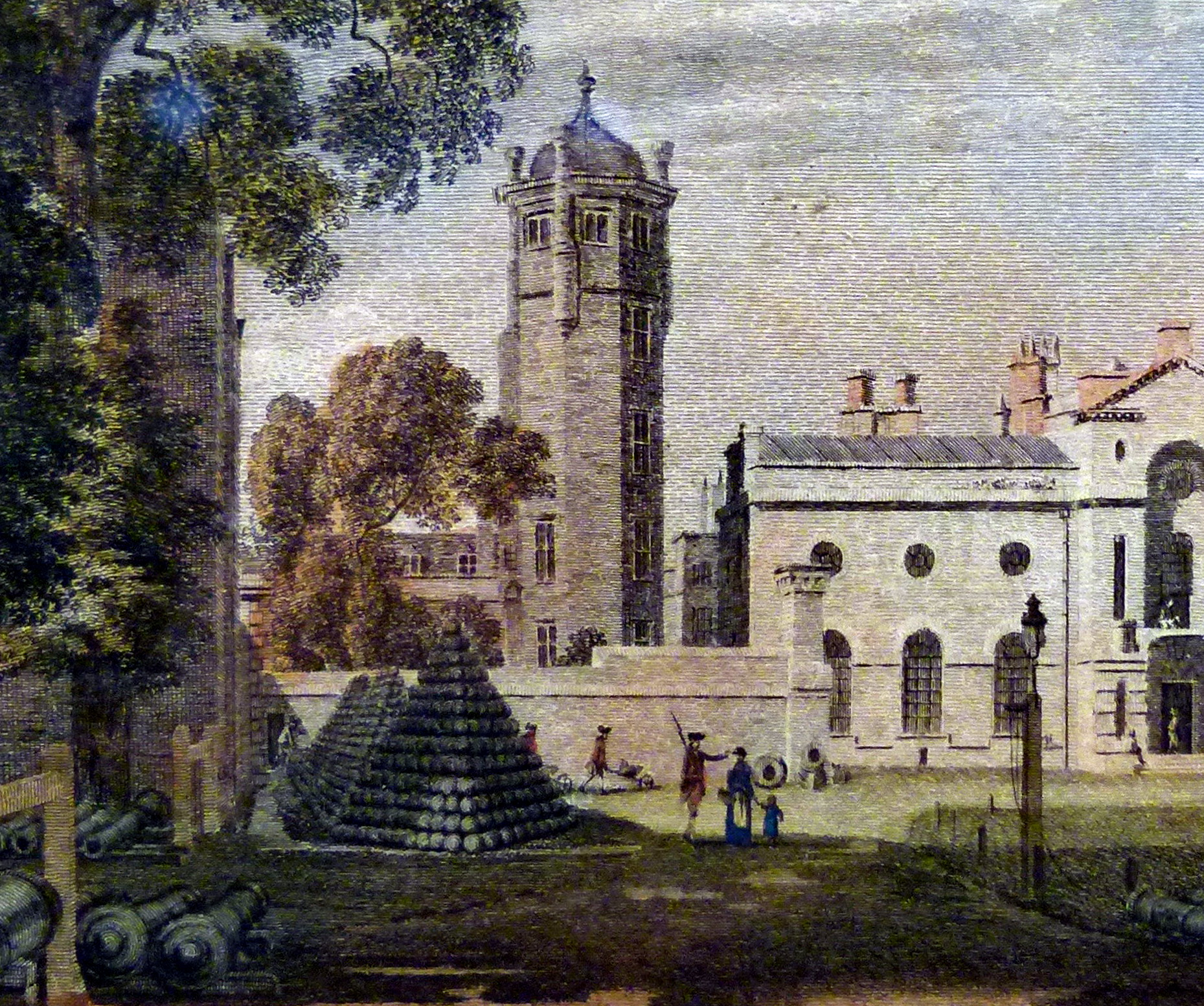
The Warren and the octagonal tower of Tower Place (1775?)

Further east stood Tower Place, a Tudor mansion with an octagonal tower and a warren around it. The house was built in the 1540s for Martin Bowes, a wealthy goldsmith and merchant, later a Lord Mayor of London. Bowes had bought riverside holdings in Woolwich and Plumstead in the 1530s, following the Dissolution of the Monasteries. After his death, the estate came into the possession of George Barne, also a Lord Mayor of London. His great-grandchildren Richard and Francis Lovelace may have been born here in the early 17th century. In the mid-17th century weapons testing began at the Warren, near Tower Place. The warehouse at Gun Yard was rebuilt in 1663 as a large U-shaped building. After 1671 gun storage moved away from here to the area around Tower Place, which had been acquired by William Pritchard, an ordnance contractor from Eltham. In exchange for the 31-acre Warren or Tower Place estate, Pritchard acquired Gun Yard plus a large payment in cash. He continued using the Gun Yard for shipping and storage of military and non-military provisions, as well as adding a repair shop for gun carriages and a saltpetre refinery. Around the same time the north-west part of the yard was fenced off for the exclusive use of the ropeyard. West of Bell Water Gate, around present-day Glass Yard, there was some glass industry in the 17th century, while pottery production seems to have continued here at the same time. (Note: In 1974 two 17th-century pottery kilns were discovered at Woolwich Ferry approach, one of these a redware kiln, the other one an important early stoneware kiln. Cotter, 2008, pp. 3-5. The redware kiln which had been reburried, was cleaned in a temporary shed near Greenwich Heritage Centre in 2017.)

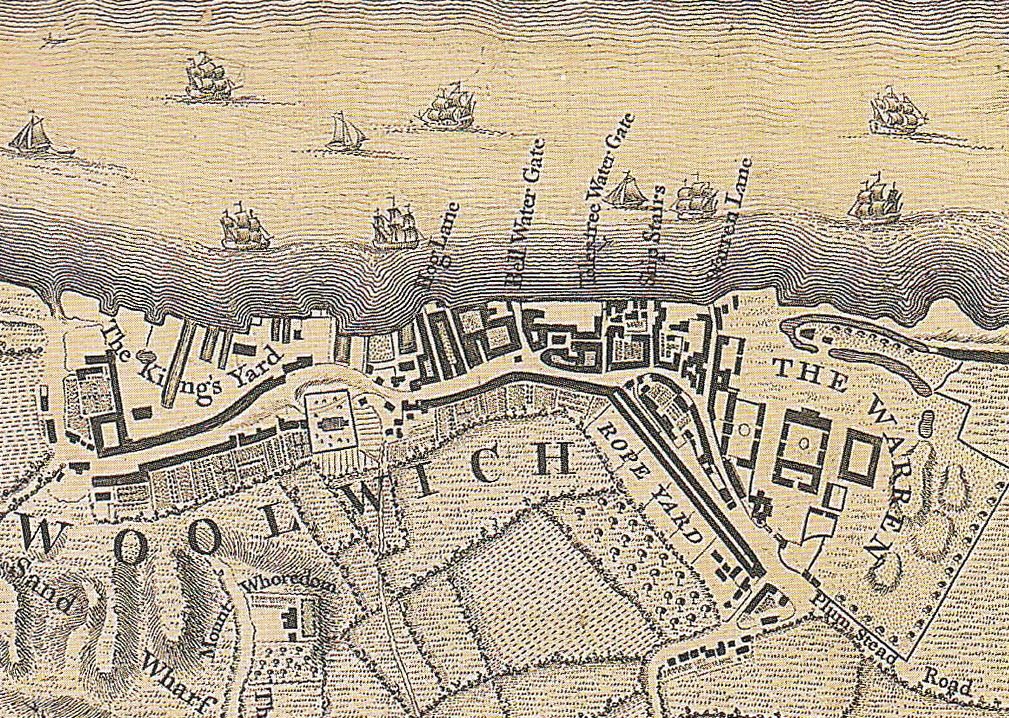
Old Woolwich between the King's Yard and the Warren (John Rocque, 1746)

By the end of the 17th century, the Warren, later the Royal Arsenal, had grown to rival the Tower of London as the country's main ordnance depot. The ropeyard was rebuilt in 1695-97 by the surveyor and naval engineer Edmund Dummer, adding a double ropewalk to the existing one. The yard was extended to 324 m, stretching all the way to Green's End. At its north end stood a brick warehouse with a clock tower. It employed as many as 400 men. This, and the shipbuilding at Woolwich Dockyard, attracted ever more workers to Woolwich, which due to the malarial marshland was not a popular posting. However, the town's population grew rapidly, to about 6,500 in 1720. The entire area between the Dockyard and the Warren was filled in with houses. The south part of Gun Yard (facing the High Street) was developed in the 1720s as a market surrounded by houses on three sides and with a central market office. The northern part of the plot remained in use as a riverside wharf throughout the 18th century, partly for stacking timber. The parish church of St Mary Magdalene was rebuilt in the 1730s through aid from the Commission for Building Fifty New Churches. The new church was bigger and stood slightly further back from the river. John Rocque's Map of London of 1746 shows very few buildings south of the main east-west street and the ropeyard. Five streets, all perpendicular to the High Street, are marked on the map: Hog Lane, Bell Water Gate, Taler Tree Gate, Ship Stairs and Warren Lane. Apart from that, the built-up area consisted of Church Hill, Parson's Hill, Woolwich High Street, a pocket of houses between the Ropeyard and the Warren, and a scattering of cottages at Green's End (now Beresford Square). On another map of 1748-49 the so-called watermen's stairs are marked, used for loading and offloading ships. They are all situated at the north ends of the aforementioned streets, some with poetic names: Green Dragon Stairs, Blue Anchor Stairs and Sheep (or Ship) Stairs.

=== 19th century: Victorian slum ===
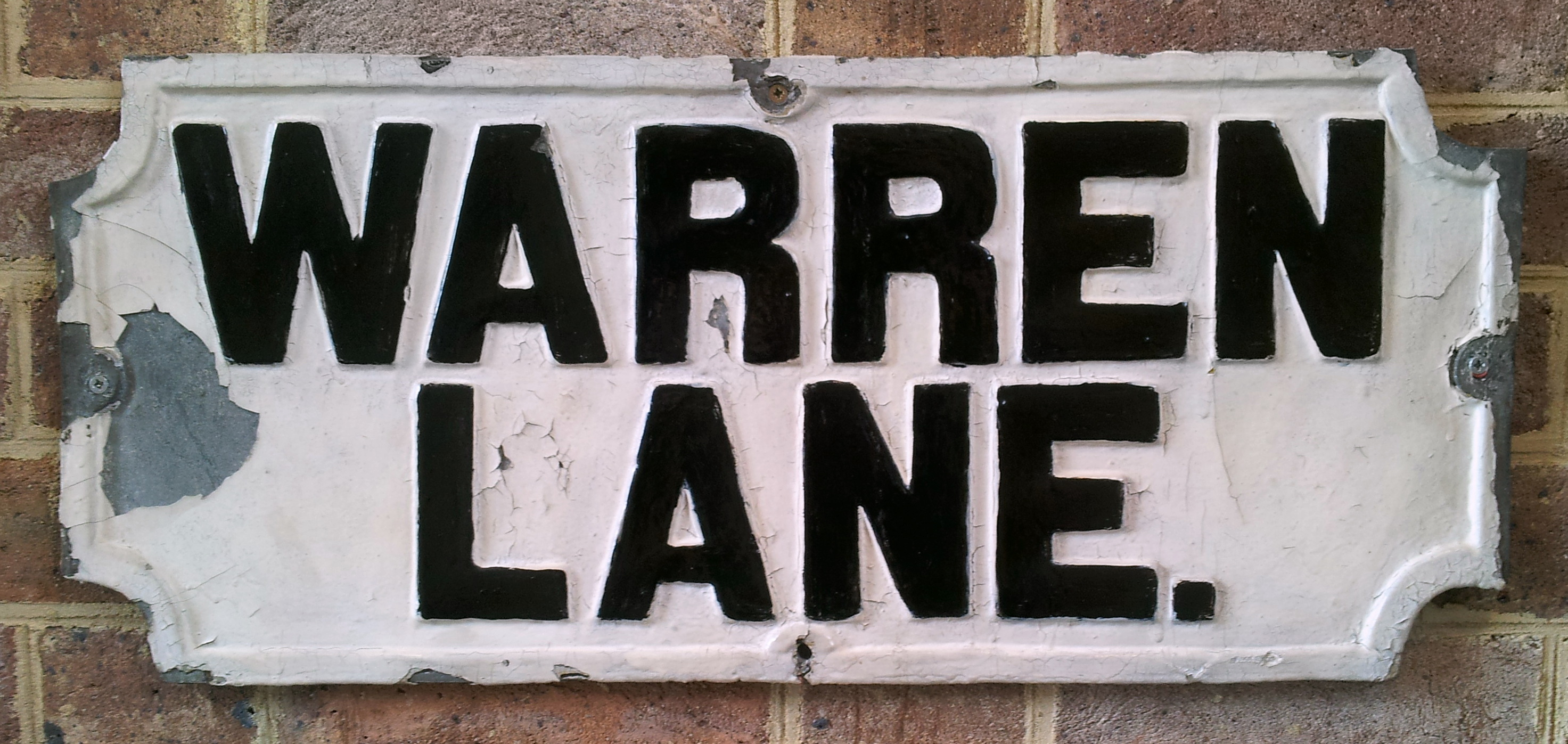
Warren Lane in the "Dusthole" (GHC)

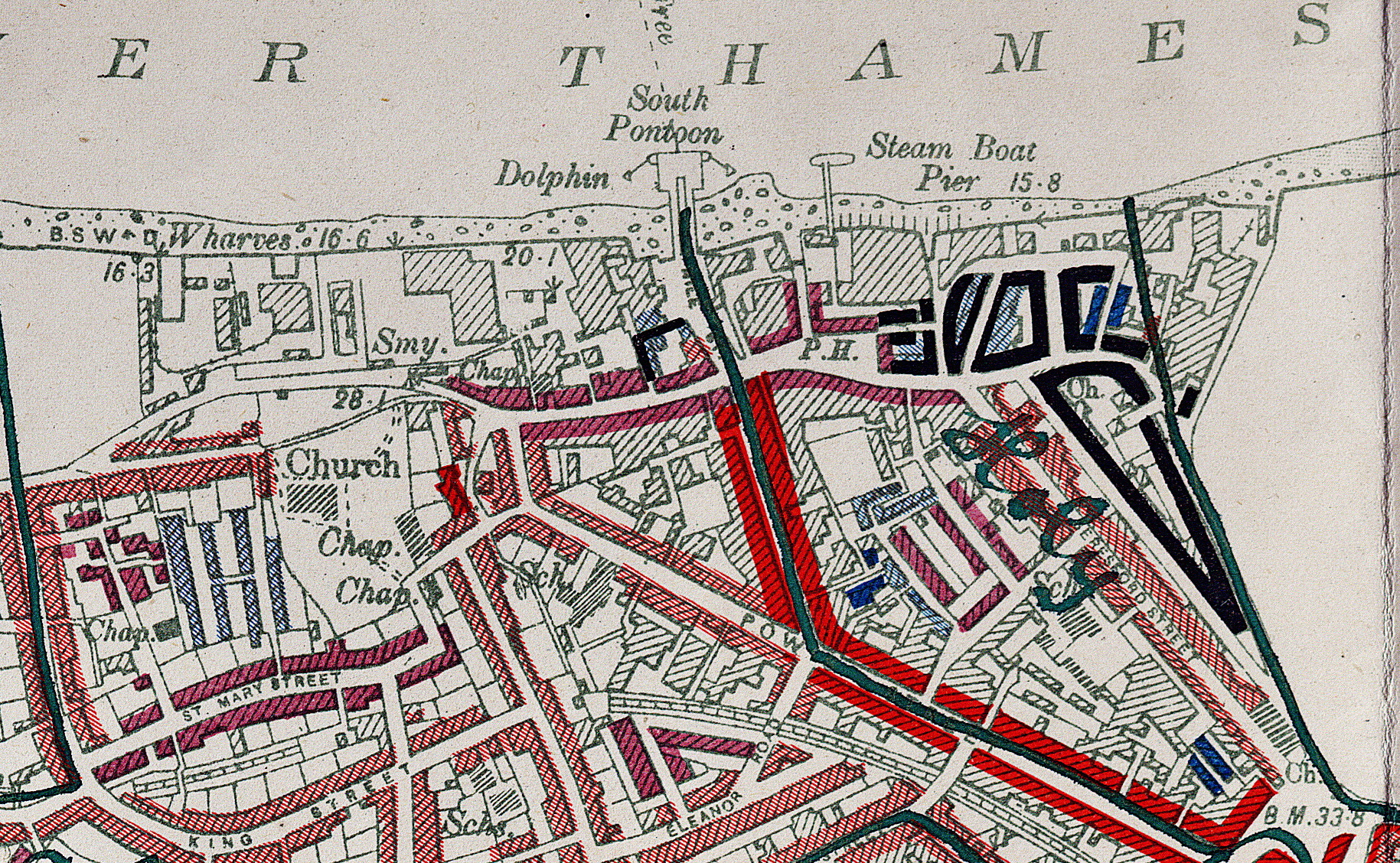
Poverty map of central Woolwich, 1889. The areas in black designate the "lowest class, vicious, semi-criminals". Bright red is "middle class, well-to-do"

In the late 18th century, the population of Woolwich approached 10,000 and new areas for housing were found south of the main street. A new town centre comprising Beresford Square, Powis Street and the Bathway Quarter was laid out around 1800. The ropeyard closed in 1832 and the site was acquired by the Greenwich wine merchant George Smith. Three years later the area was cleared and Beresford Street was laid out. By 1847 the street had been fully developed with two-storey-houses (some double-fronted, one room deep), two public houses (Beresford Arms and Duke of Sussex), a theatre (Theatre Royal, later Woolwich Empire) and a chapel (Wesleyan Association Chapel; later followed by Baptist Tabernacle, Salvation Army Chapel and St Saviour's Mission). At the eastern end of the street, facing Beresford Square, Holy Trinity Church was built in 1833-34. This large Anglican church had an imposing façade in Portland stone with a stump tower above a Greek Revival portico.

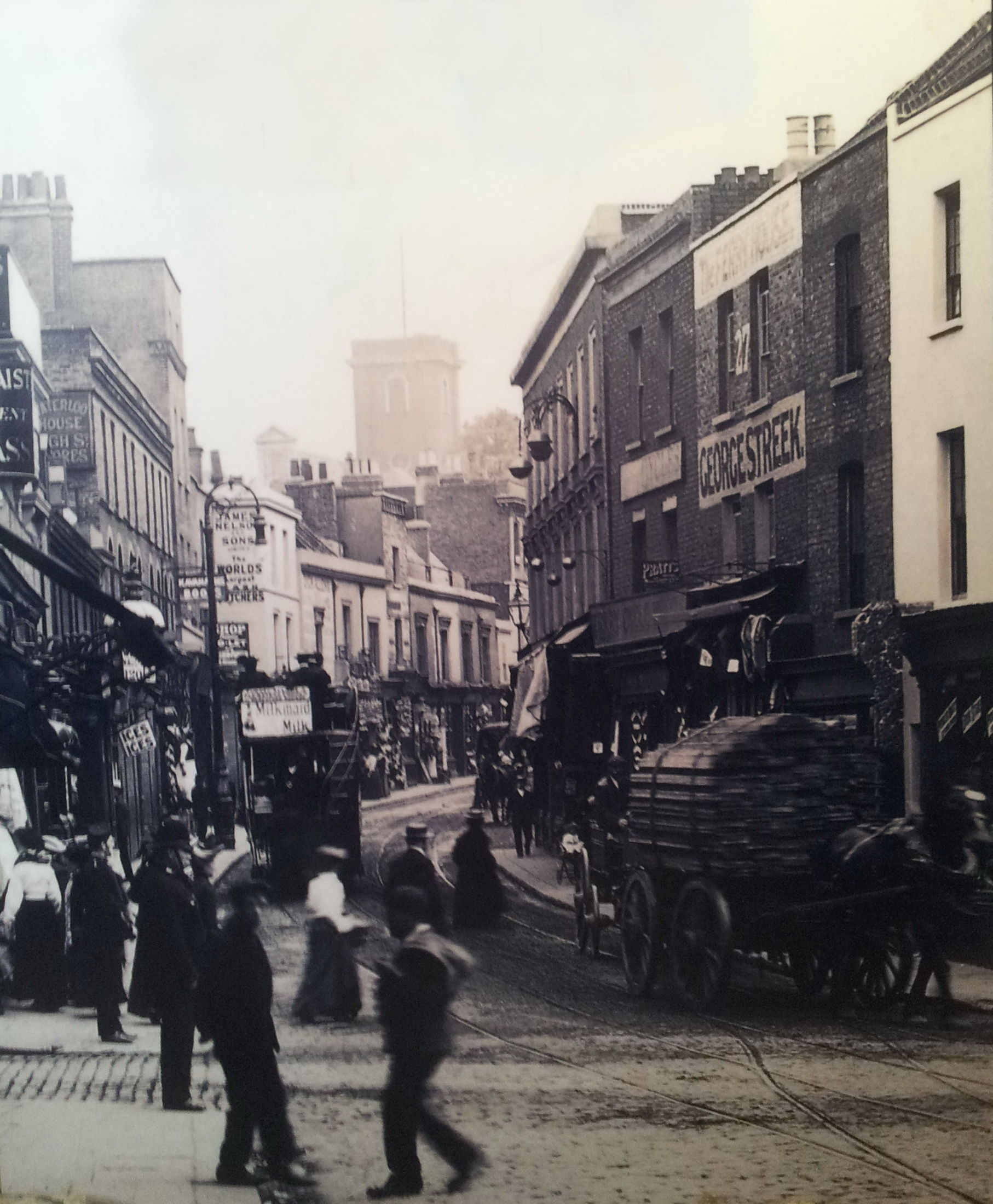
Woolwich High Street c.1900

In 1856 the overcrowded churchyard at St Mary Magdalene's was closed and a new parish cemetery, Woolwich cemetery, opened in Plumstead. In 1893-95 the old churchyard was transformed into a public park, St Mary's Gardens. The park formed an oasis between the densely populated streets south of Woolwich Church Street, and the Dockyard north of it. An attempt was made to move the market from Market Hill to Market Street in the Bathway Quarter but this proved to be unpopular. In 1888 the market was officially established at Beresford Square. Powis Street became a successful commercial street and replaced Woolwich High Street as the town's main shopping area. Horse-drawn trams arrived in Woolwich Church Street, High Street and Beresford Street in 1881. The Woolwich Free Ferry was established in 1889, replacing privately owned ferry services. Between Nile Street and Surgeon Street an entire block had to be cleared in order to build the ferry terminal, new river walls and approach roads.

The area north of the High Street gradually turned into a Victorian slum. The most notorious part was the so-called Dusthole, between Beresford Street, Warren Lane and the river, named after the dust from neighbouring coal wharves. Many people that lived in this area were of Irish descent. Poverty and prostitution were prevalent here. (Note: General William Booth of the Salvation Army described the Dusthole in 1890: "The women living and following their dreadful business in this neighbourhood are so degraded that even abandoned men will refuse to accompany them home. Soldiers are forbidden to enter the place (...) A policeman never goes down this street alone at night." The social reformer Charles Booth added in 1900: "Women with broken noses, swollen faces, bare dirty unkempt faces and heads, draggled skirts, frayed edges everywhere, coarse Irish faces, bare arms. No men about." Saint & Guillery (2012), p. 55.) The depravity of the area attracted numerous religious institutions and led in 1850 to the establishment of the Woolwich Baths and Lecture Hall on Nelson Street, one of London's earliest public baths. Later in the 19th century, more and more houses were replaced by industrial developments (coal wharves, a gas company and a power station).

=== 20th-21st century: redevelopment ===
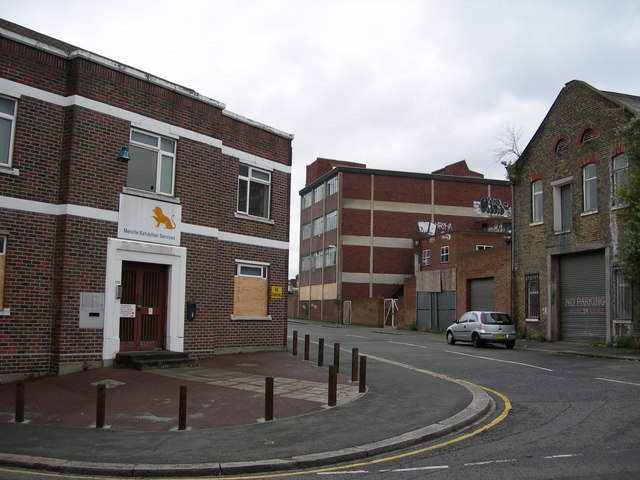
Ropeyard Rails and Warren Lane light industrial estate (demolished in 2007)

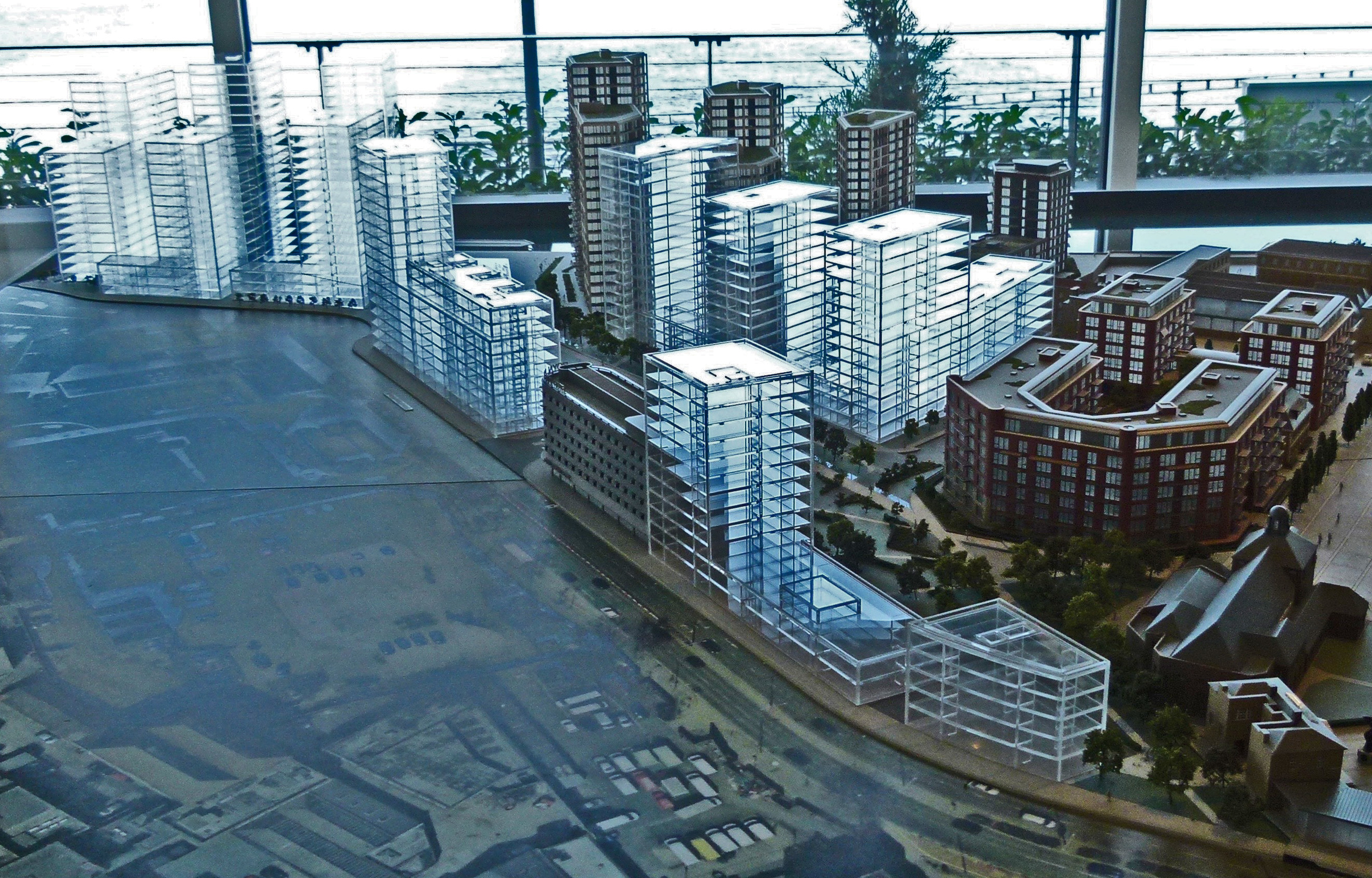
Scale model Waterfront development

During the 20th century most remaining parts of Old Woolwich were demolished, initially to make room for military and industrial developments (expansion of the Royal Arsenal and Woolwich Power Station), later also for entertainment venues (Granada and Odeon cinemas). In the second half of the century road widening, new car parks, the relocation of the Woolwich Ferry terminal, as well as large-scale building projects such as the Auto Stacker (1961), Riverside House (1963) and a new leisure centre (1988) made further demands on land in the riverside area.

A modest power station built in 1893 in Globe Lane was taken over by Woolwich Borough Council in 1903. As its capacity grew, the buildings at Woolwich Power Station were almost continuously renewed until it closed down in 1978. Around 1965 the ferry approach was moved further west where it was connected via a roundabout to a new dual carriageway (John Wilson Street). A marshalling yard was added west of the ferry approach. Woolwich High Street and Beresford Street were widened around the same time. A light industrial estate at Ropeyard Rails replaced what had once been the infamous Dusthole. In the mid-1980s, more buildings in Beresford Street were cleared in order to reroute the A206 north of the Royal Arsenal Gatehouse. All these projects involved large-scale demolition in the historic heart of Woolwich. Presented as 'slum clearance', it met with little resistance in a town that was used to being rebuilt continuously.

With the successful regeneration of the former Royal Arsenal by Greenwich Council and Berkeley Homes, urban renewal has spread to the Central Riverside Area. More than three thousand homes are planned here, mainly luxury apartments in tower blocks near the river (Waterfront, West Quay & Armourer's Courts developments), as well as directly south of the A206 (Callis Yard, Murray's Yard & Spray Street developments). The first proposals for the Waterfront & West Quay towers were presented by Berkeley Homes in 2004. It occupies the sites of the historic gun wharf, as well as - ironically - the Dusthole. Although slowed down by the 2008 financial crisis, the plan gained new momentum in 2014 when it was decided that Woolwich would be connected to Crossrail. The Royal Arsenal Gardens have been partly built on, partly realigned as Maribor Park. A 128-bedroom hotel facing Beresford Street and the first of around ten residential towers were completed in 2017. By 2023, six of ten tower blocks were completed, with two more nearing completion. In the 2012 Woolwich Town Centre Masterplan, Greenwich Council revealed plans for the Glass Yard site. The Waterfront Leisure Centre will relocate to General Gordon Square (under construction in 2023) and the old site will be redeveloped for mixed use whereby the extension of Hare Street to the river front (in effect the reconstruction of historic Hog Lane / Nile Street) is an important element.

== Heritage and architecture ==
Very little remains of Old Woolwich, even from the industrial and post-industrial phases of the 19th and 20th century. Among the buildings that have disappeared are Tower Place, the Ropeyard with its clock tower, Holy Trinity Church as well as several other churches and chapels, the Empire Theatre, at least ten pubs, the Woolwich Baths, Woolwich Power Station and the Auto Stacker. Of the buildings that remain none are older than the Georgian era, including the church of St Mary Magdalene. Most of the shops on Woolwich High Street have been rebuilt several times. Although severely altered, they hold some historical value.

=== Riverside area ===
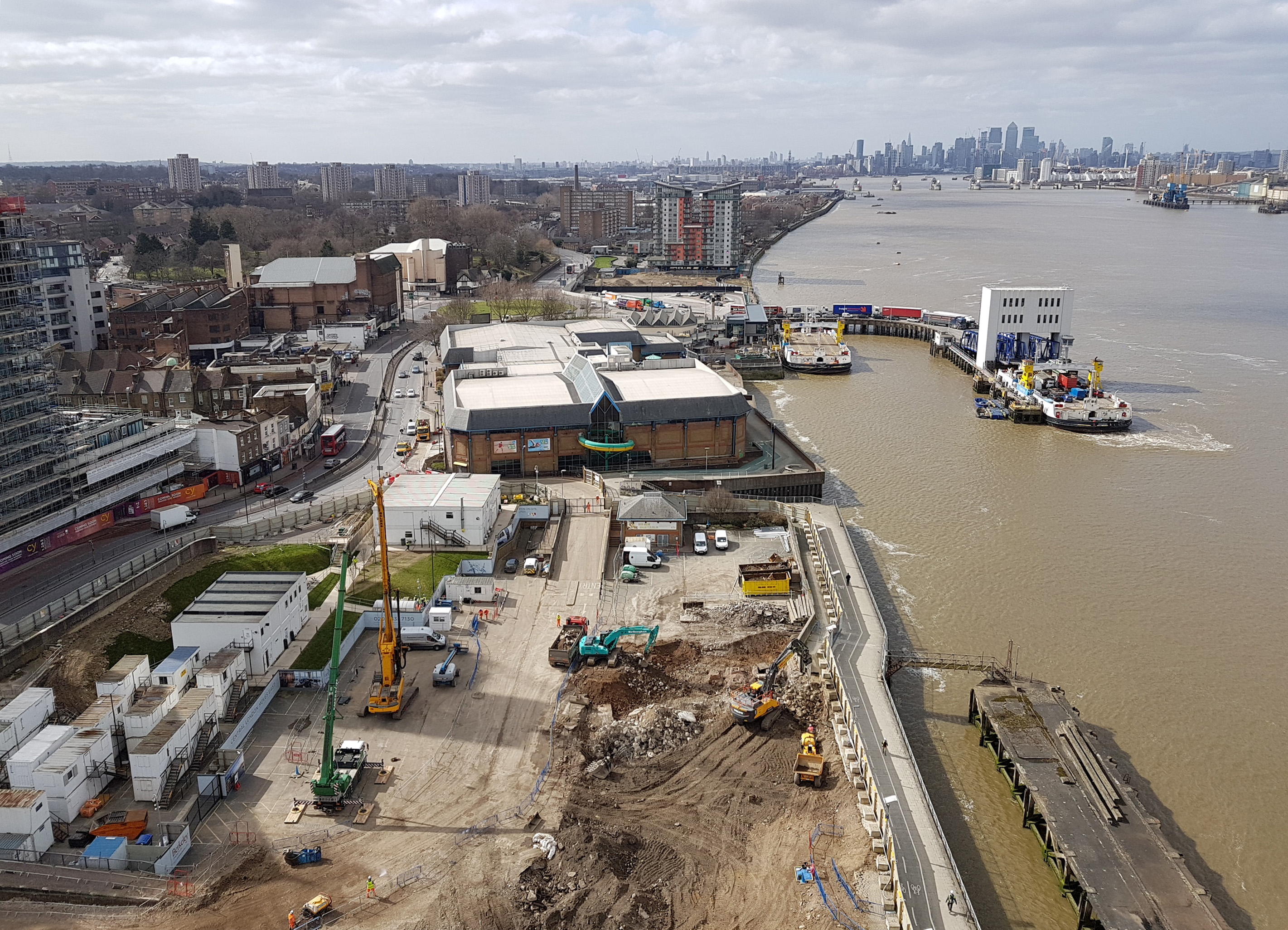
West Quay construction site as seen from Waterfront III in 2018

Some sections of the Thames river wall date from the early 19th century. Remnants of watermen's stairs can be seen at Bell Water Gate and behind the Waterfront Leisure Centre at the end of Nile Street (formerly Hog Lane). The Bell Water Gate river stairs were altered in 1824 and have remained largely unchanged since. The Hog Lane or Green Dragon Stairs were reconstructed in concrete in the 1970s but the old paved causeway can still be seen at low tide. The coaling jetty of 1930-31 is all that remains of Woolwich Power Station. The Woolwich Ferry terminal as it exists today largely dates from the 1960s. From the roundabout and the adjacent car park a four-lane concrete causeway curves towards the loading ramp. The most prominent element is a 21 m wide and 29 m tall (above low tide) lifting tower of white polycarbonate. The ferry administration and maintenance building, as well as the ambulance station, are low-rise utilitarian structures with a touch of Brutalism. Originally the roof of the workshop block was accessible to the public as a viewing platform. The south entrance building of the Woolwich Foot Tunnel was built at the north-west side of Nile Street in 1910-12. It is now hidden behind the Waterfront Leisure Centre. The round building of red brick with its leaded dome is the oldest surviving building in this area. The Waterfront Leisure Centre stands at the original sites of the Woolwich Ferry terminal and Woolwich Power Station. It was built in 1986-88 as a replacement for the Public Baths in Bathway. The original design consisted of two separate units on both sides of Nile Street. It included a large indoor swimming pool, sports facilities, a supermarket, a garden centre, a petrol station and flats surrounded by public spaces. These ambitious plans were scaled down after construction had started, which resulted in the current hybrid building of red and yellow brick and mirrored-glass façades with blue detailing. A riverside walk was laid out around the same time. It now forms part of the Thames Path. East of the leisure centre a large car park occupies the site of the former Woolwich Power Station coal yard. This and the land further east is earmarked for redevelopment. Closer to the Royal Arsenal the Waterfront residential tower blocks have topped out at just under 80 m.

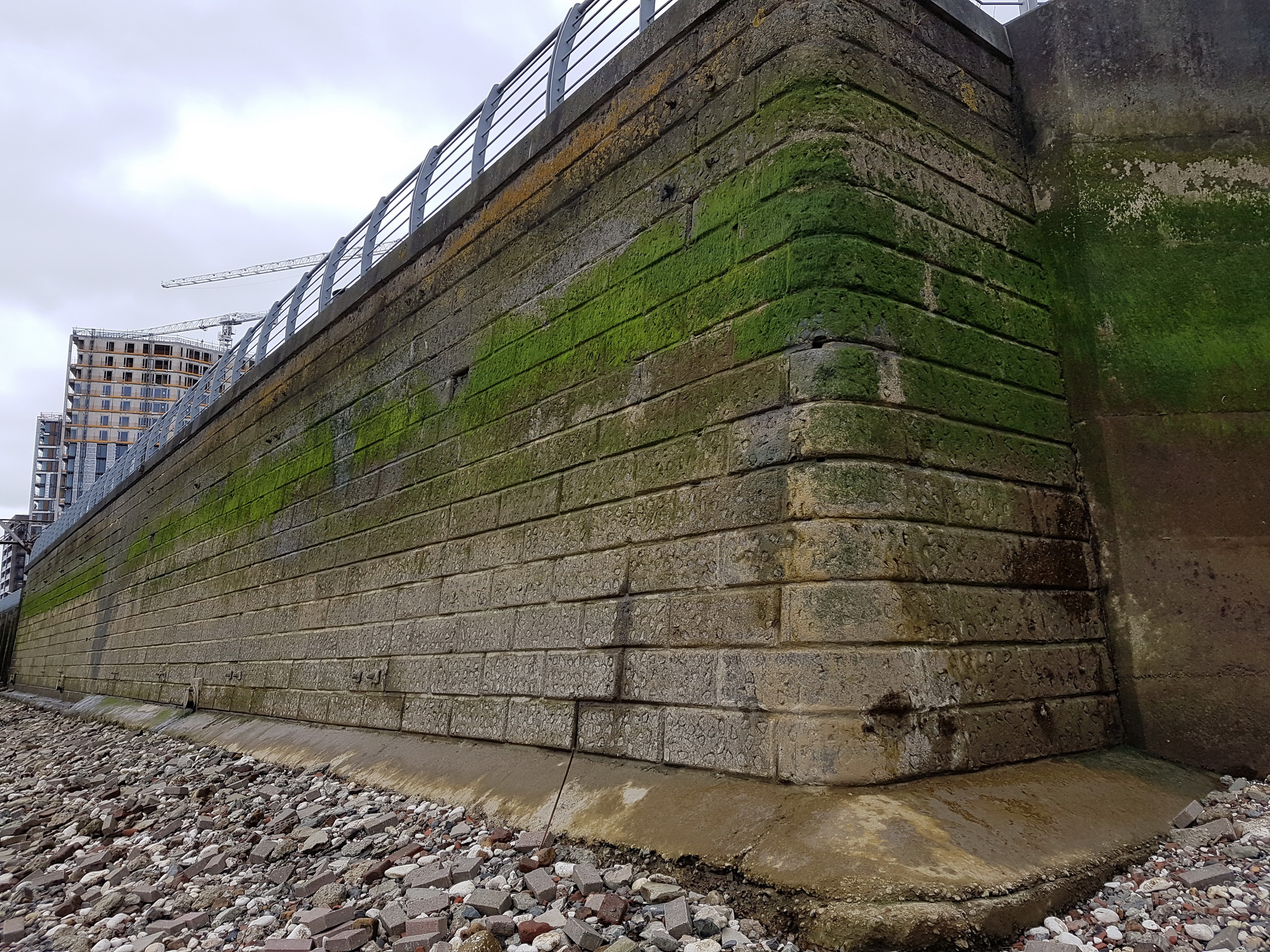
River wall near Bell Water Gate

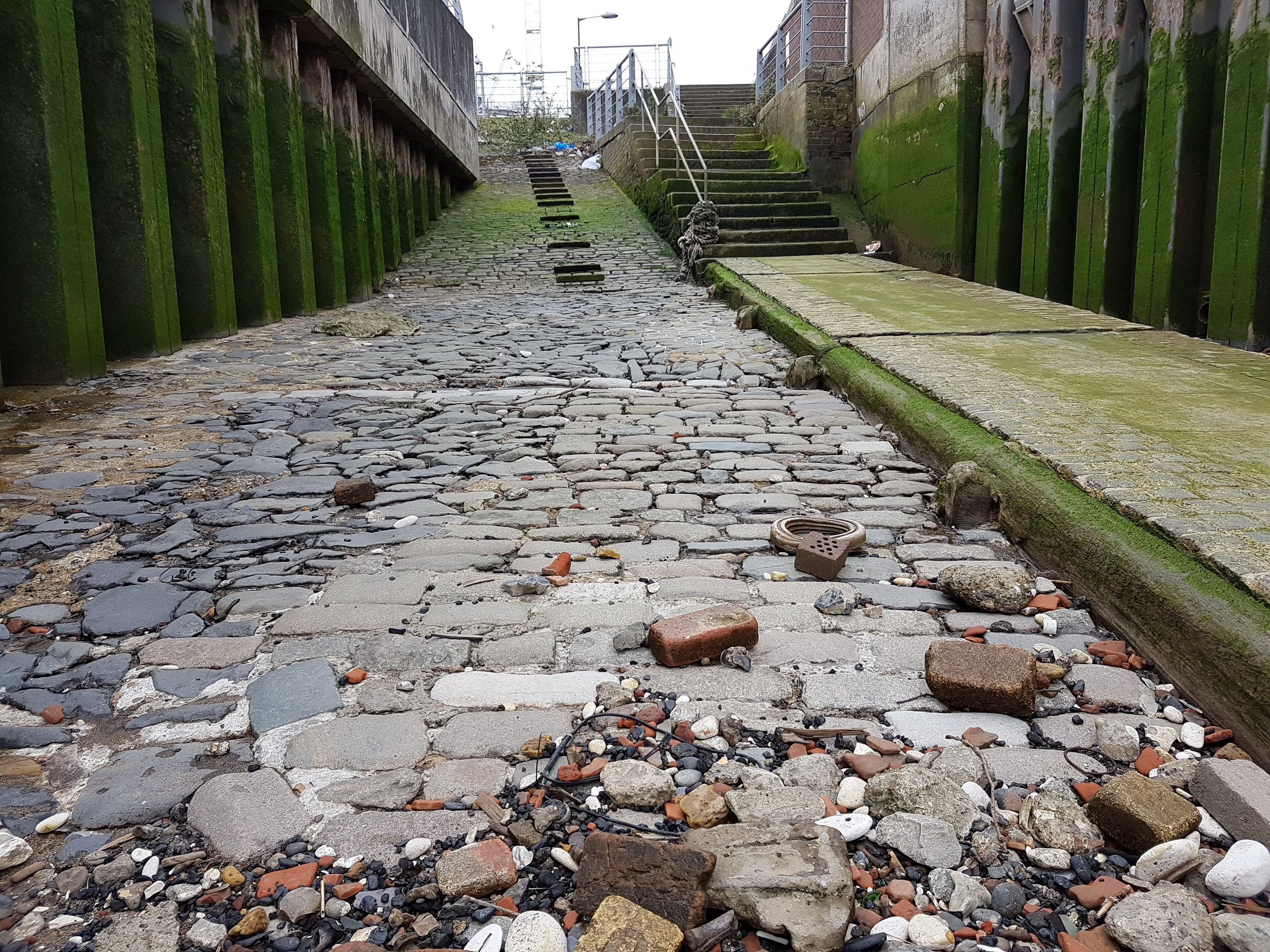
Watermen's stairs at Bell Water Gate

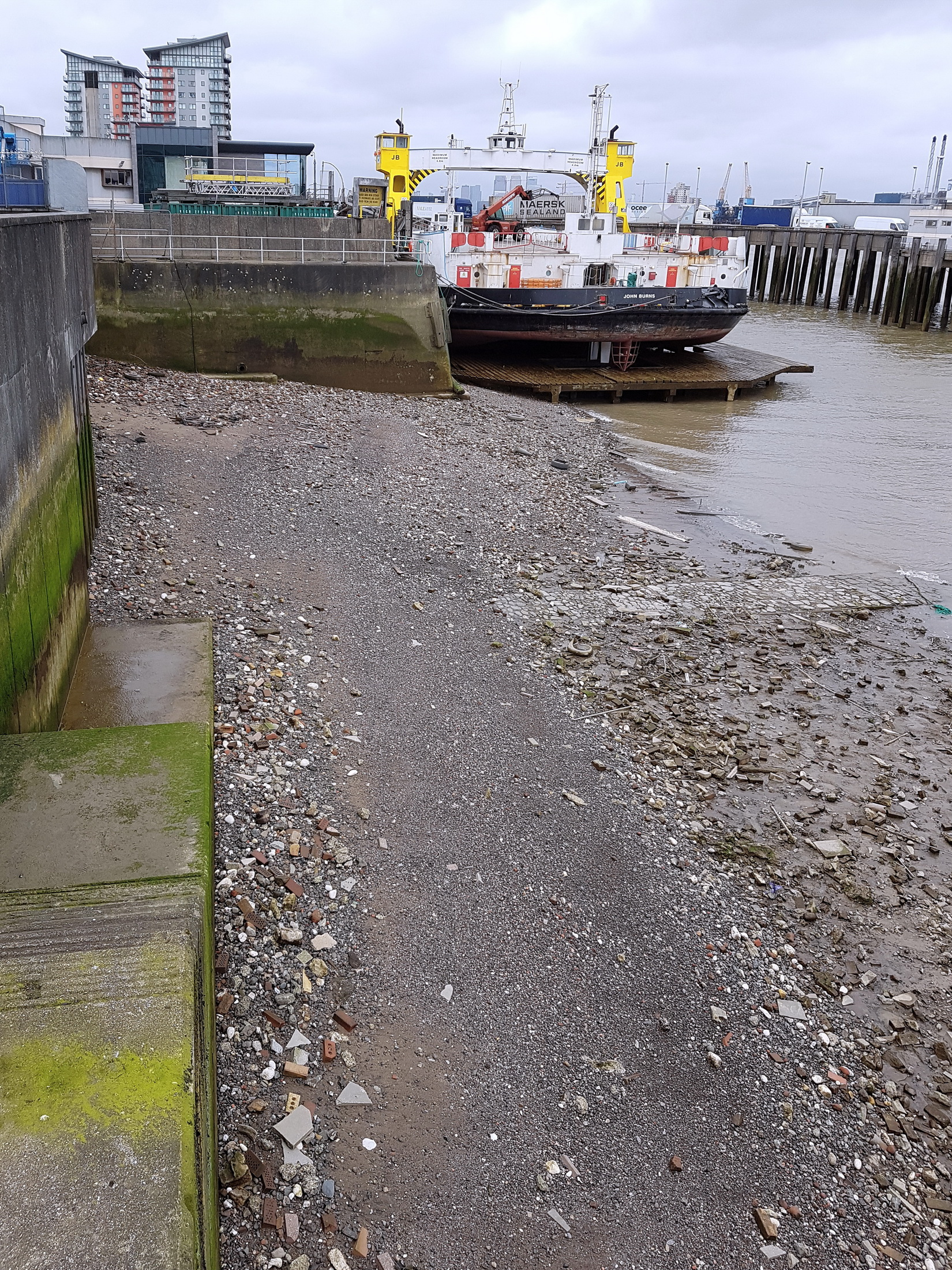
Hog Lane Stairs and causeway (centre right)

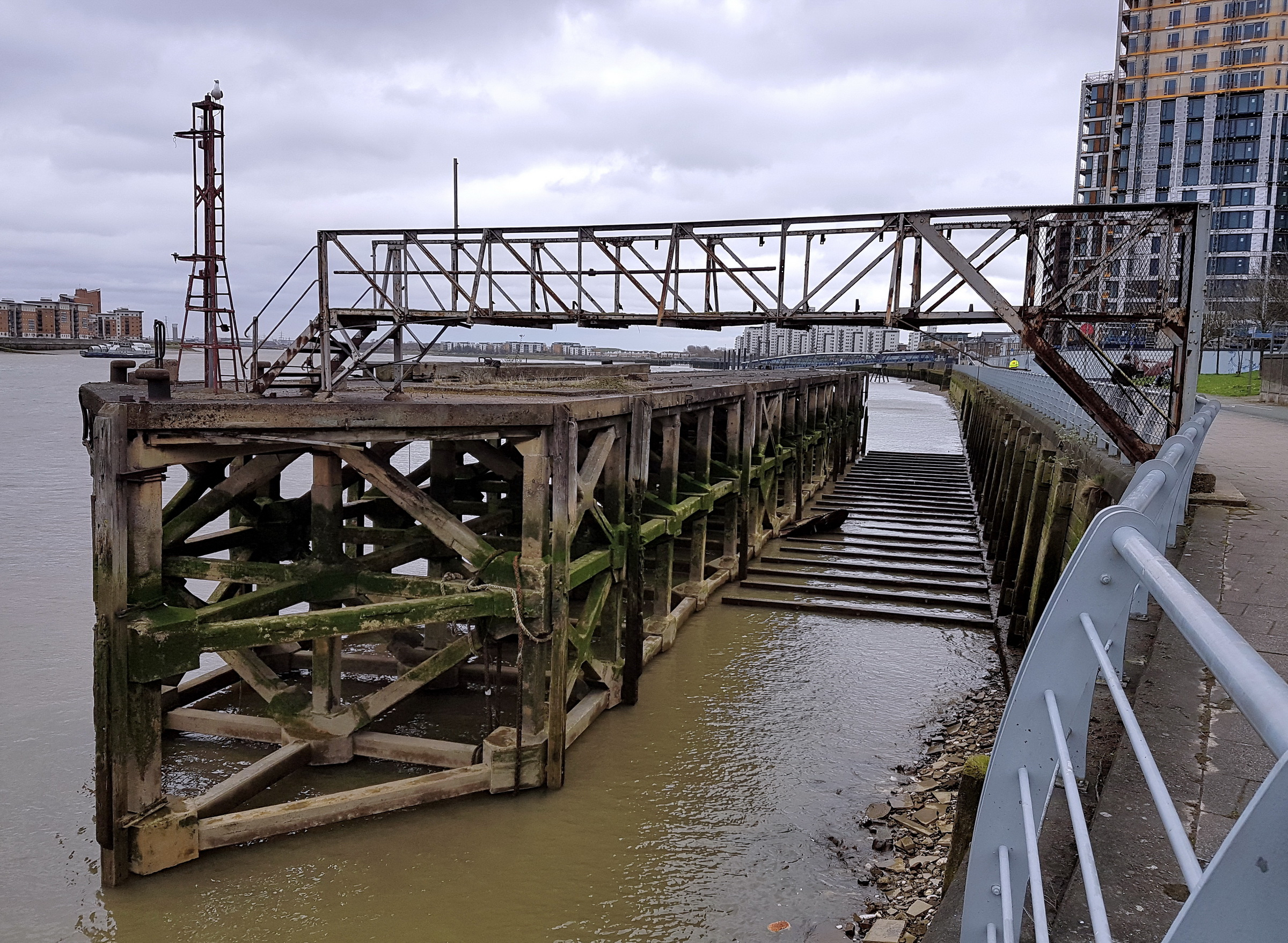
Woolwich Power Station coaling jetty

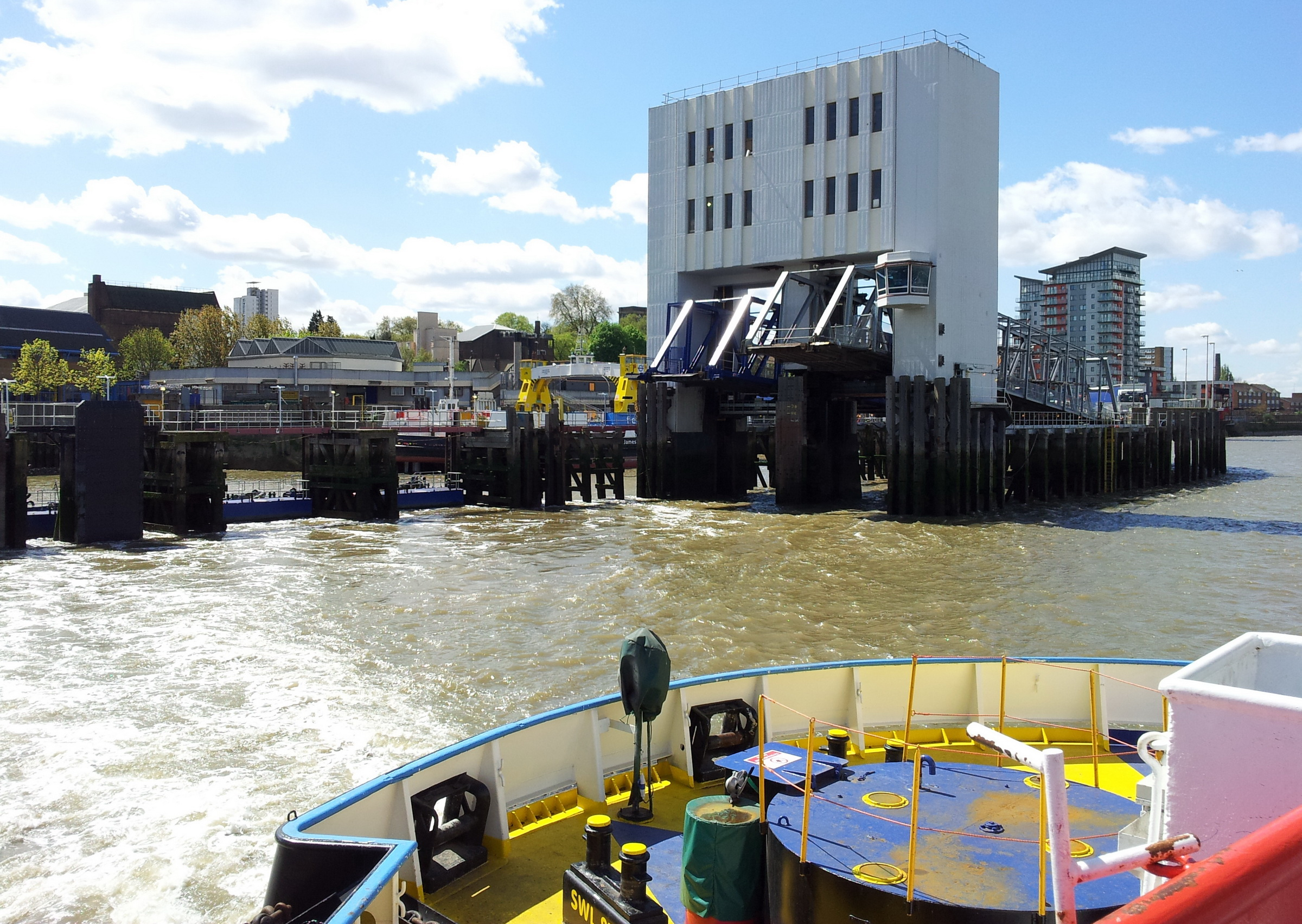
Woolwich Ferry terminal

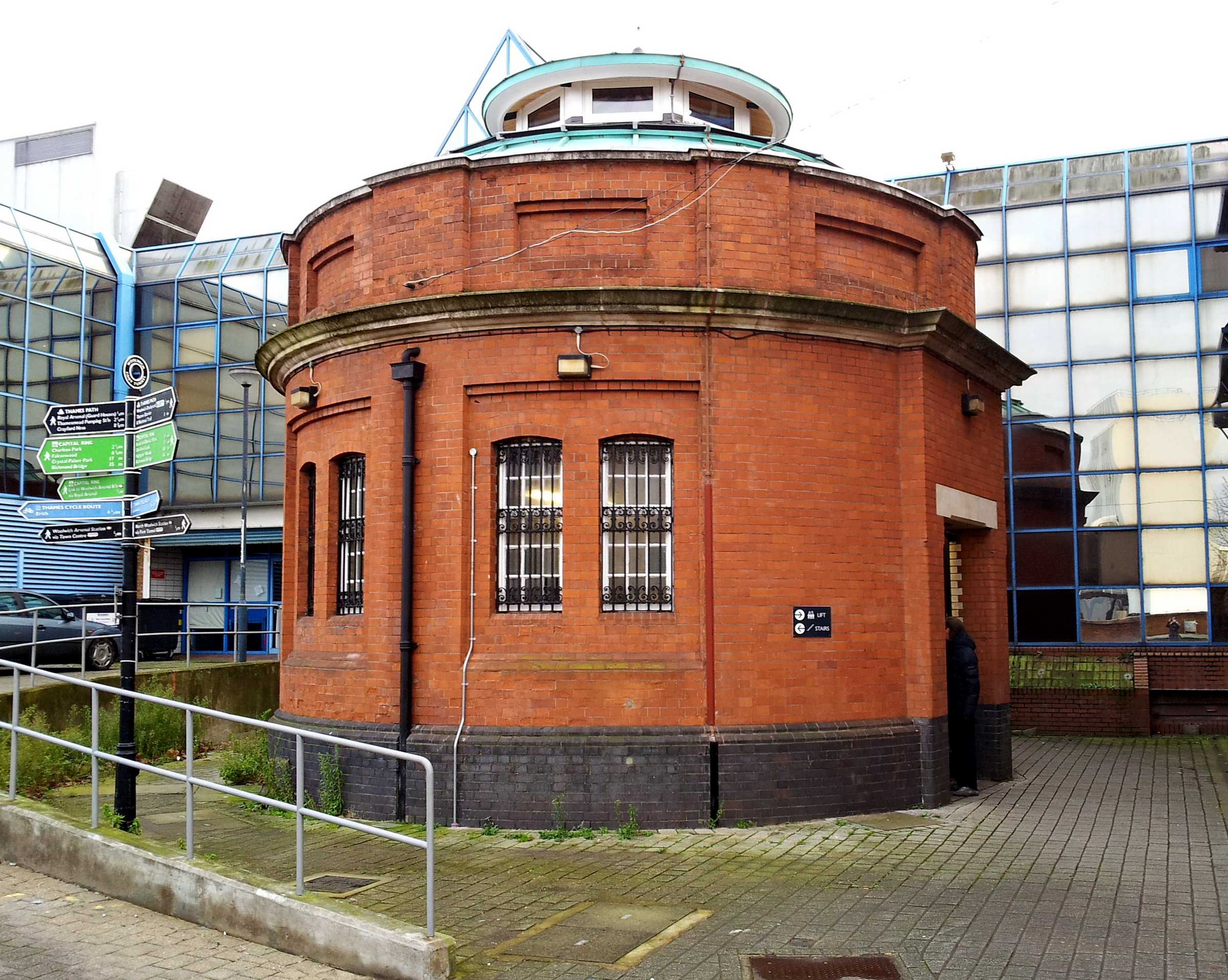
Woolwich foot tunnel south entrance building

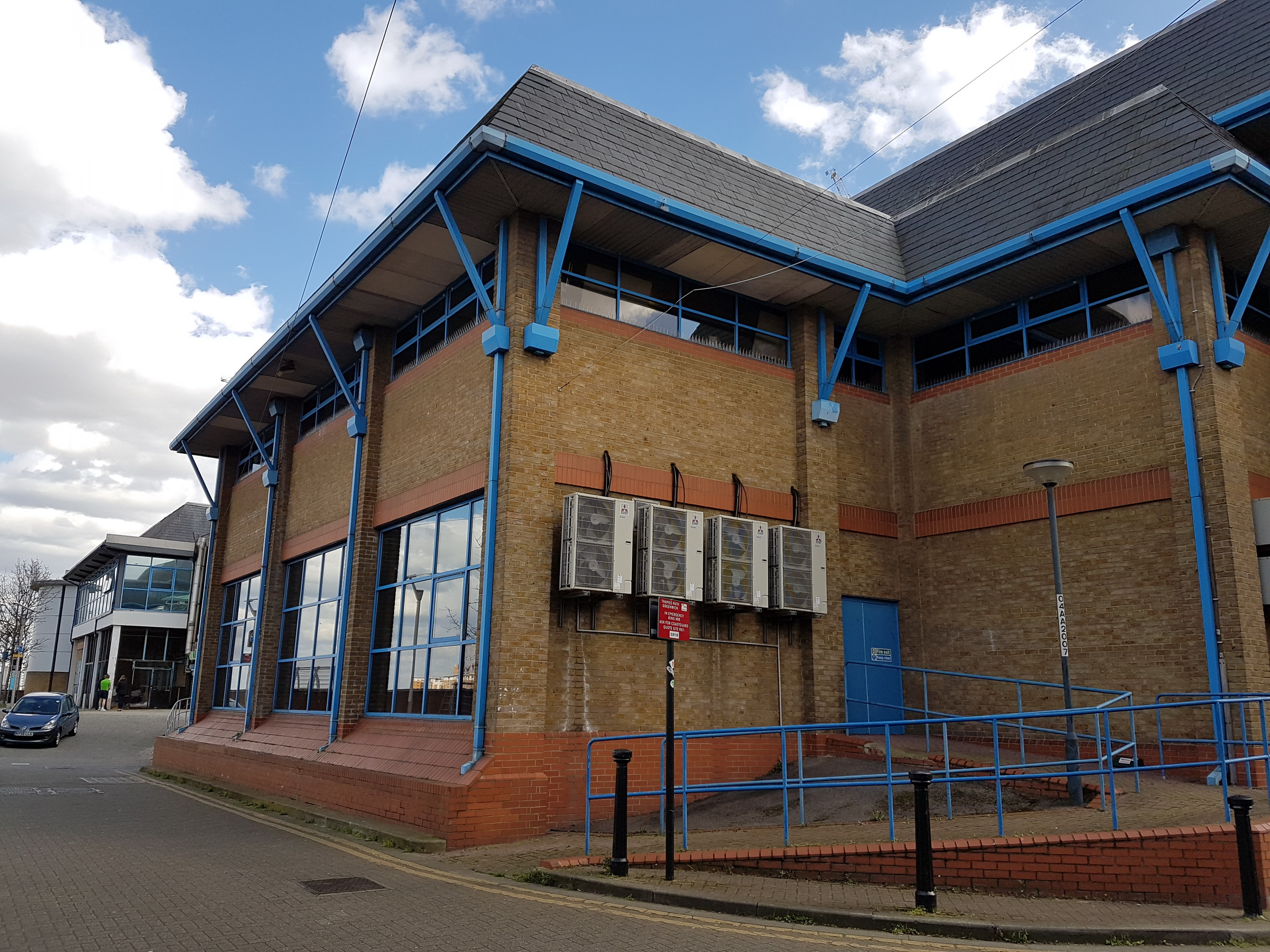
Waterfront Leisure Centre and Thames Path

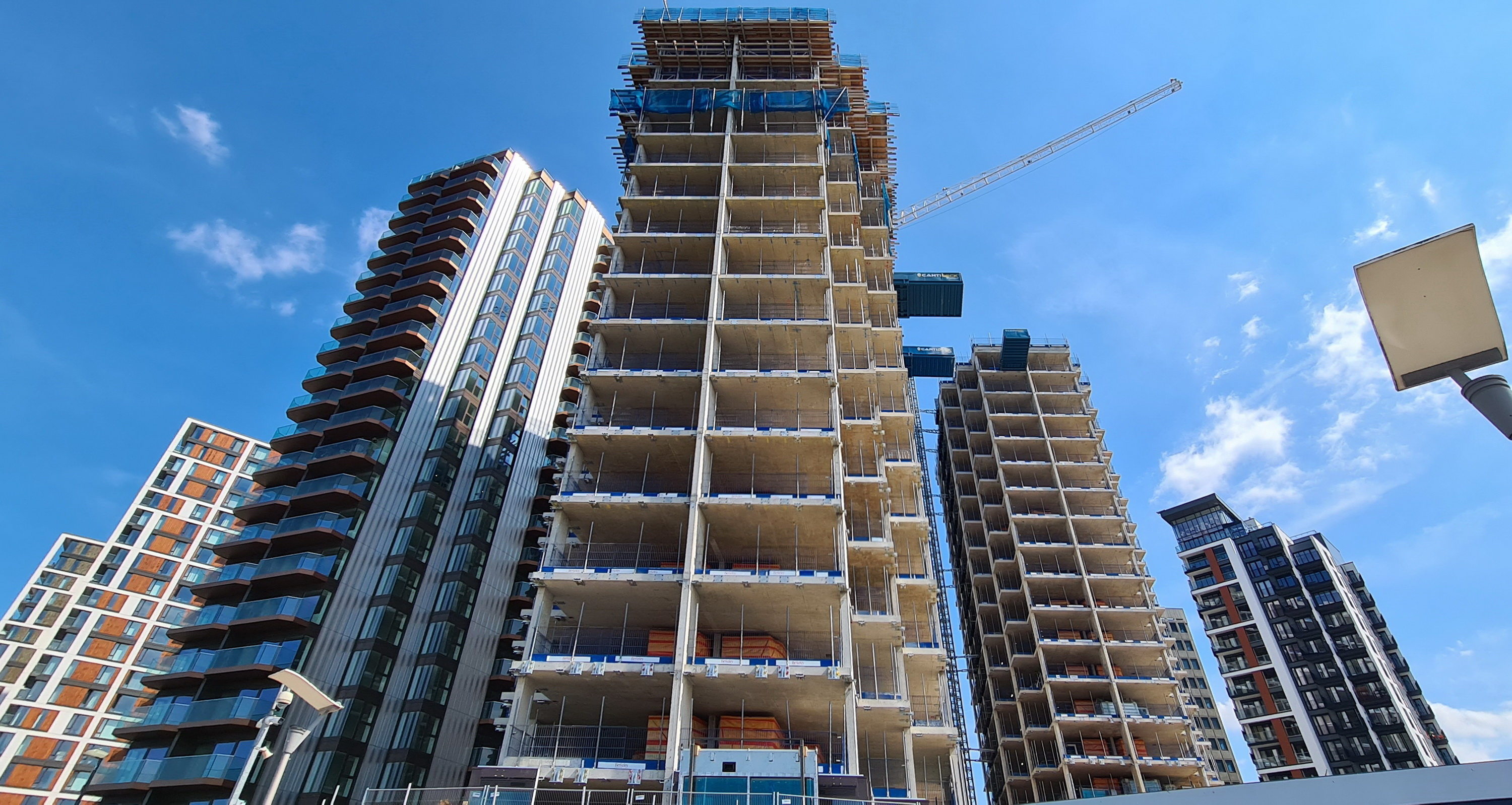
Waterfront & West Quay developments in 2022

=== Around Church Hill and Parson's Hill ===
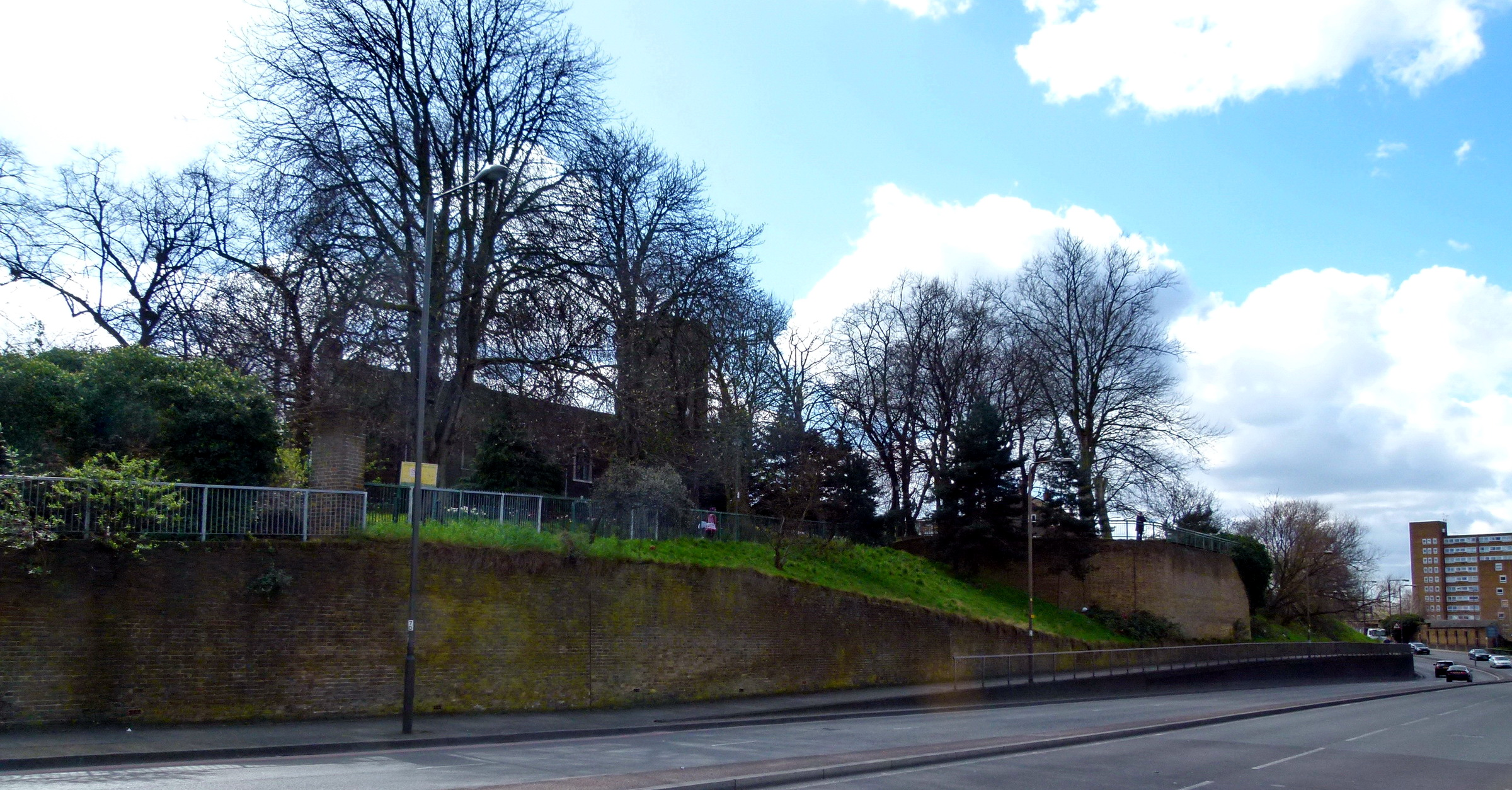
St Mary's Gardens from Church Street

Woolwich parish church sits on a promontory named Church Hill that was settled early on. Nothing of the original houses in this area survived. The church of St Mary Magdalen is a plain brick building with a spireless tower, built in 1732-39. St Mary's Gardens was laid out as a park in Romantic style on the grounds of the former churchyard. The park features a belvedere with views of the river. A brick wall along Woolwich Church Street forms the southern boundary of Woolwich Dockyard. The development of the Mast Quay Buildings (phase 1, 2004-06), at the eastern extremity of the Dockyard, was amongst the earliest signs of urban renewal in Woolwich. In 2022, two tower blocks were added.

A few older buildings remain south of the roundabout where the A205 meets the A206. At the eastern slope of Church Hill an unusual cluster is formed by two derelict buildings and a formidable Art Deco cinema. The former Odeon Cinema, now called Gateway House, is used by the New Wine Church. Its streamlined exterior looks as glamorous as it did in the 1930s. The Mitre public house was rebuilt in 1927-28 in the typical half-timbered Brewer's Tudor style of the period. It closed in 2008. Adjacent is a small house called Ferry Cottage that probably dates from the early 19th century.

On the east side of the South Circular Road is Parson's Hill, a remainder of an old path climbing up between the old rectory on the High Street and the parish church on Church Hill. All that's left is an early 19th-century house and the Castle Tavern, an old public house that was rebuilt in 1937. The rest of Parson's Hill, including two chapels, was swept away in the 1960s construction of John Wilson Road.

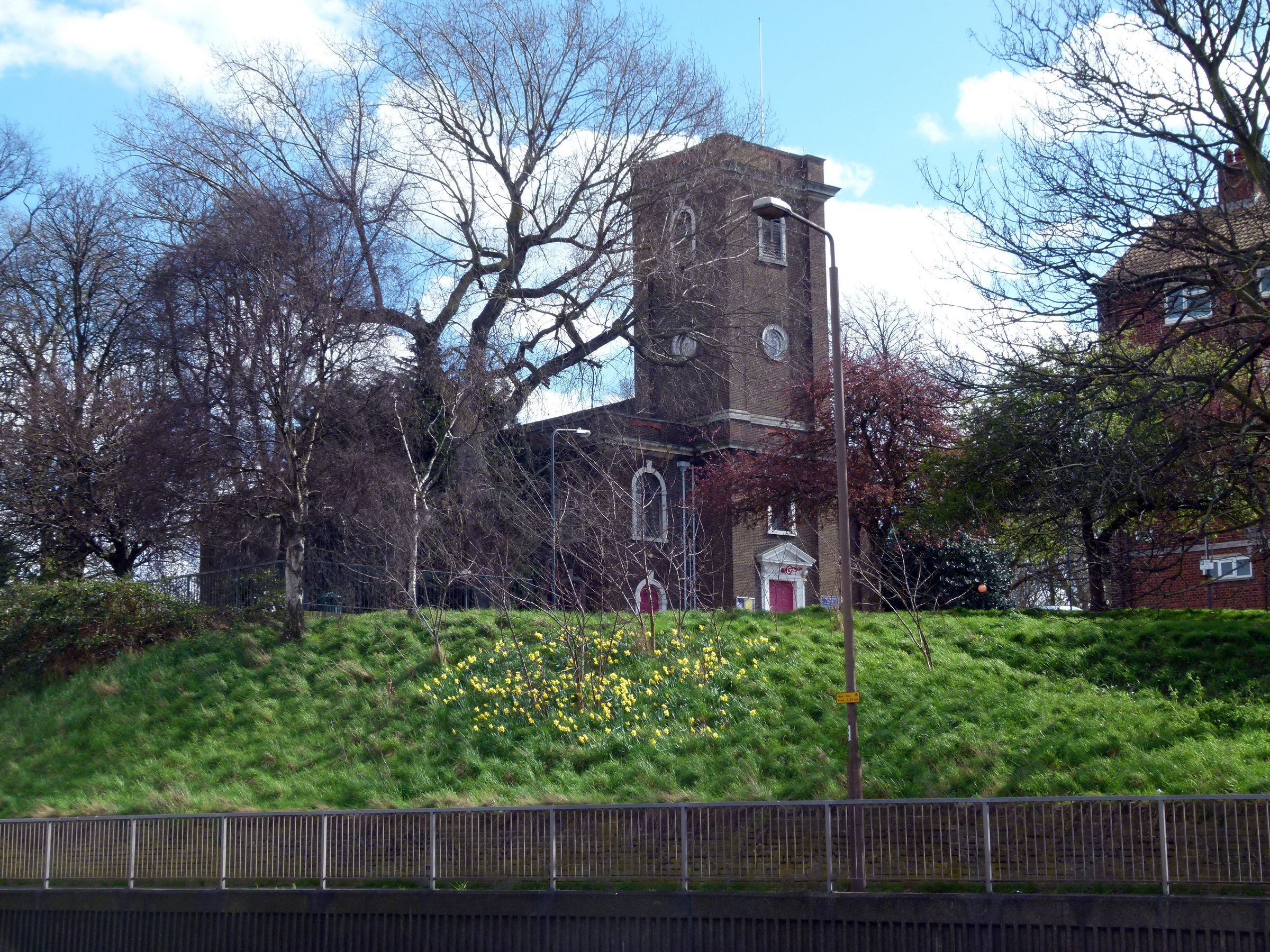
St Mary Magdalene's on top of Church Hill

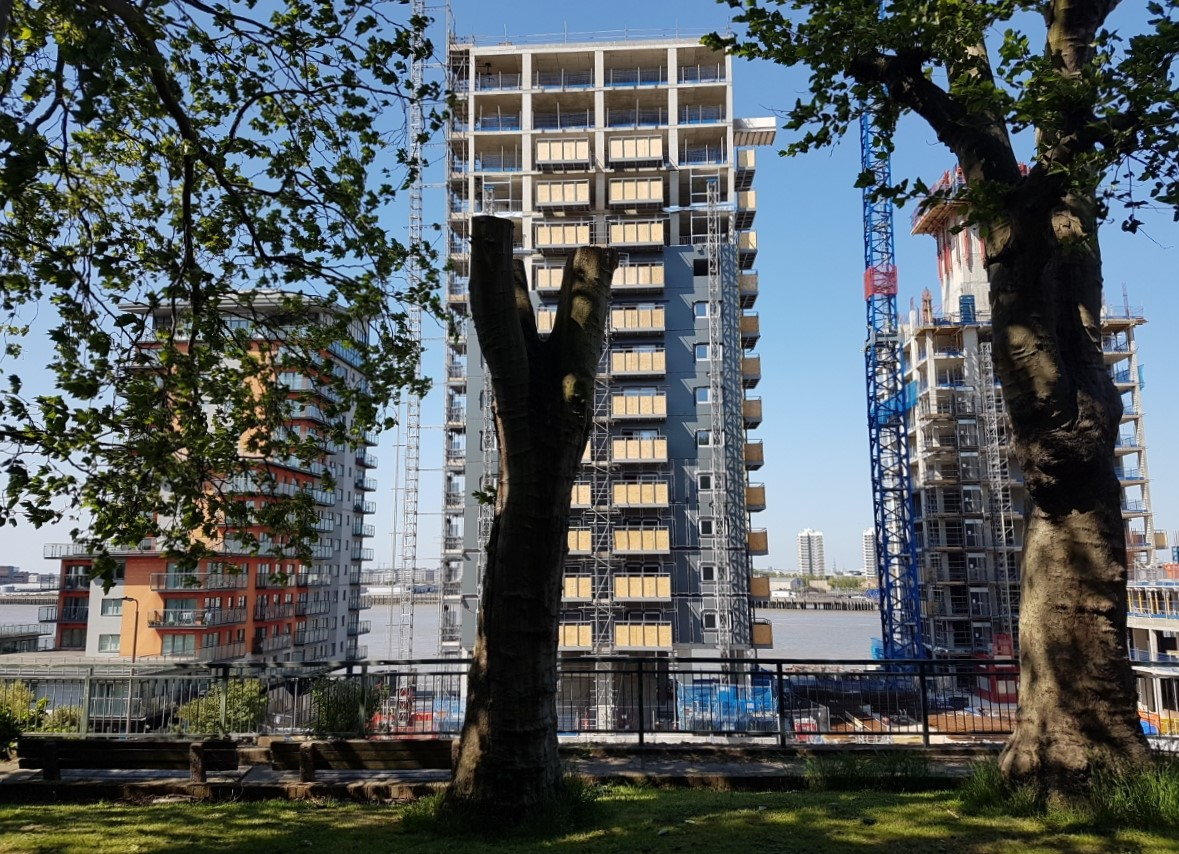
Mast Quay apartment blocks from St Mary's Gardens

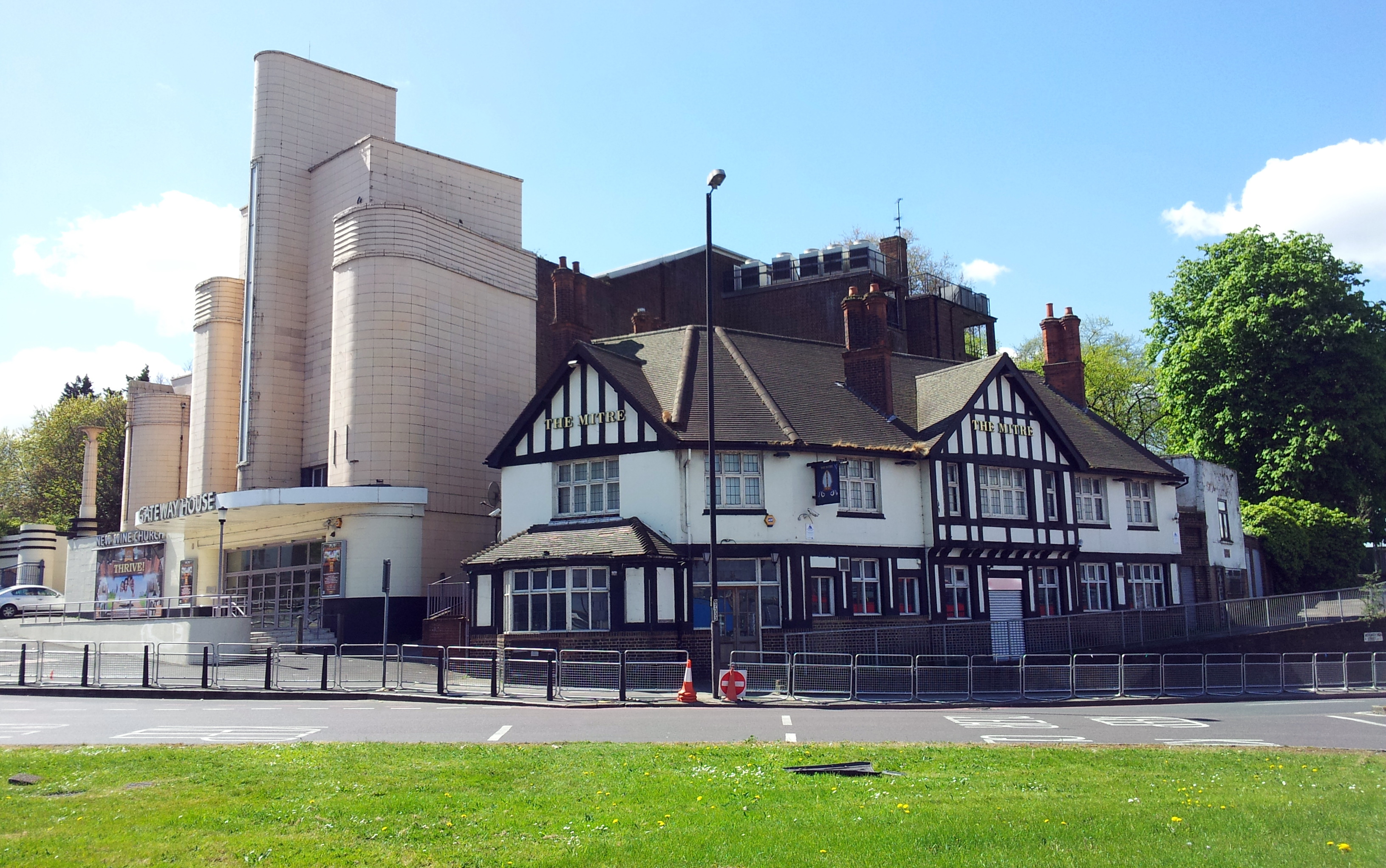
Former Odeon Cinema, The Mitre and Ferry Cottage (right)

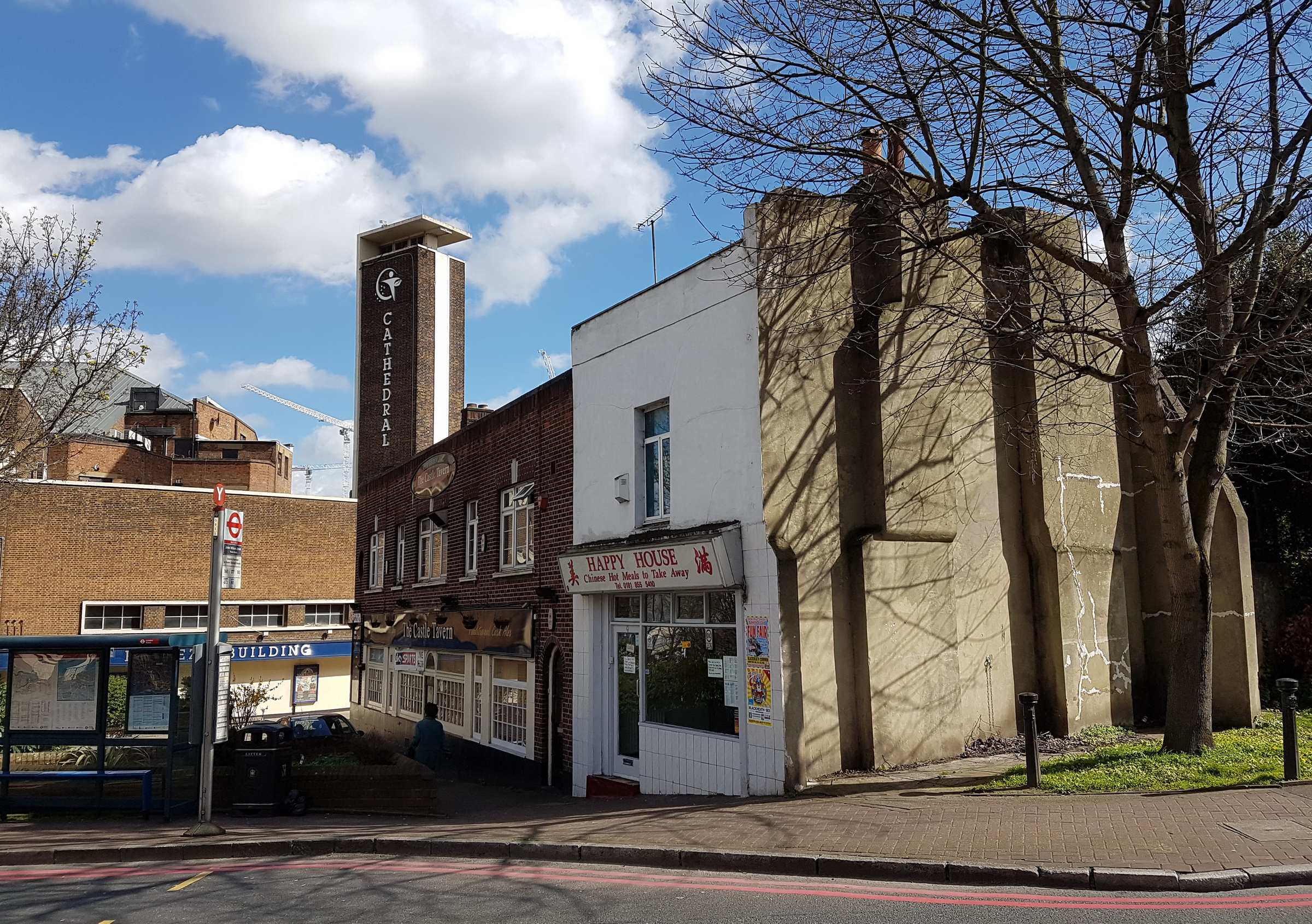
Parson's Hill and former Granada Cinema (left)

=== High Street west ===
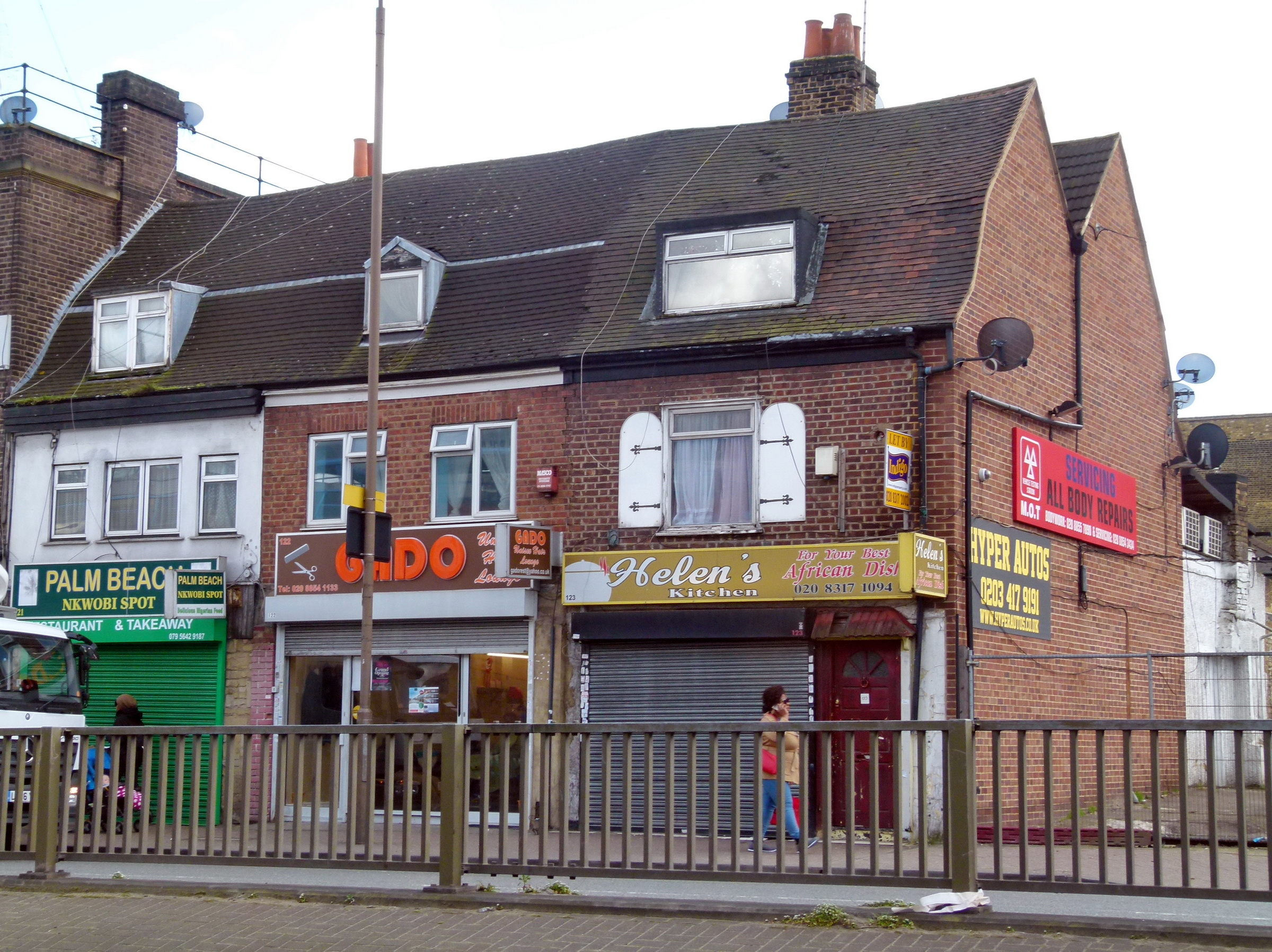
Georgian shop-houses, nos. 121-123, with M-shaped gambrel roofs

Nothing remains of the historical north elevation of Woolwich High Street. Even the relatively new Waterfront Leisure Centre has been designated for demolition. On the south side, a chaotic picture is created by two clusters of small, mostly run-down shops, a garage complex and a cinema which is by far the largest building here. The former Granada Cinema of 1936-37 is used as a Pentecostal church. It has some of the most lavish cinema interiors in London. The adjacent shop fronts (Woolwich High Street nos. 131-132) are probably from the early 19th century, perhaps built after the road-widening around 1810. Furlongs Garage occupies the site of the Dog Yard brewery, established by John Hare in the 1730s. This ambitious brick-clad garage complex dates from 1938-39. It was said to be the largest motoring complex in south-east London at the time. It comprises a four-storey garage with a ramp, linked to a smaller building by a high-level bridge over Mortgramit Square. Originally it also featured showrooms on Powis Street. The largely 1950s High Street frontage includes a filling station, a carwash and shops. To its east is a group of three, originally four Georgian shop-houses (nos. 121-123), all with M-shaped gambrel roofs. The fourth house, next to Furlongs, was demolished in 1994, after which the shops were given new frontages. The Coopers' Arms, also Plaisted's Wine House (no. 120), is a pub established around 1740 by John Hare, whose brewery stood nearby. The current neo-Georgian building dates from 1929-30. The decorative lamp is probably older. Plaisted's is separated from the corner building on Hare Street by a narrow alley that leads to a part of Mortgramit Square previously known as Dog Yard. The large cornershop was built for Burton's in 1929 with neo-Egyptian detailing. It is now a restaurant with a nightclub above. The original shopfront, mostly on Hare Street, survives behind bright yellow shuttering.

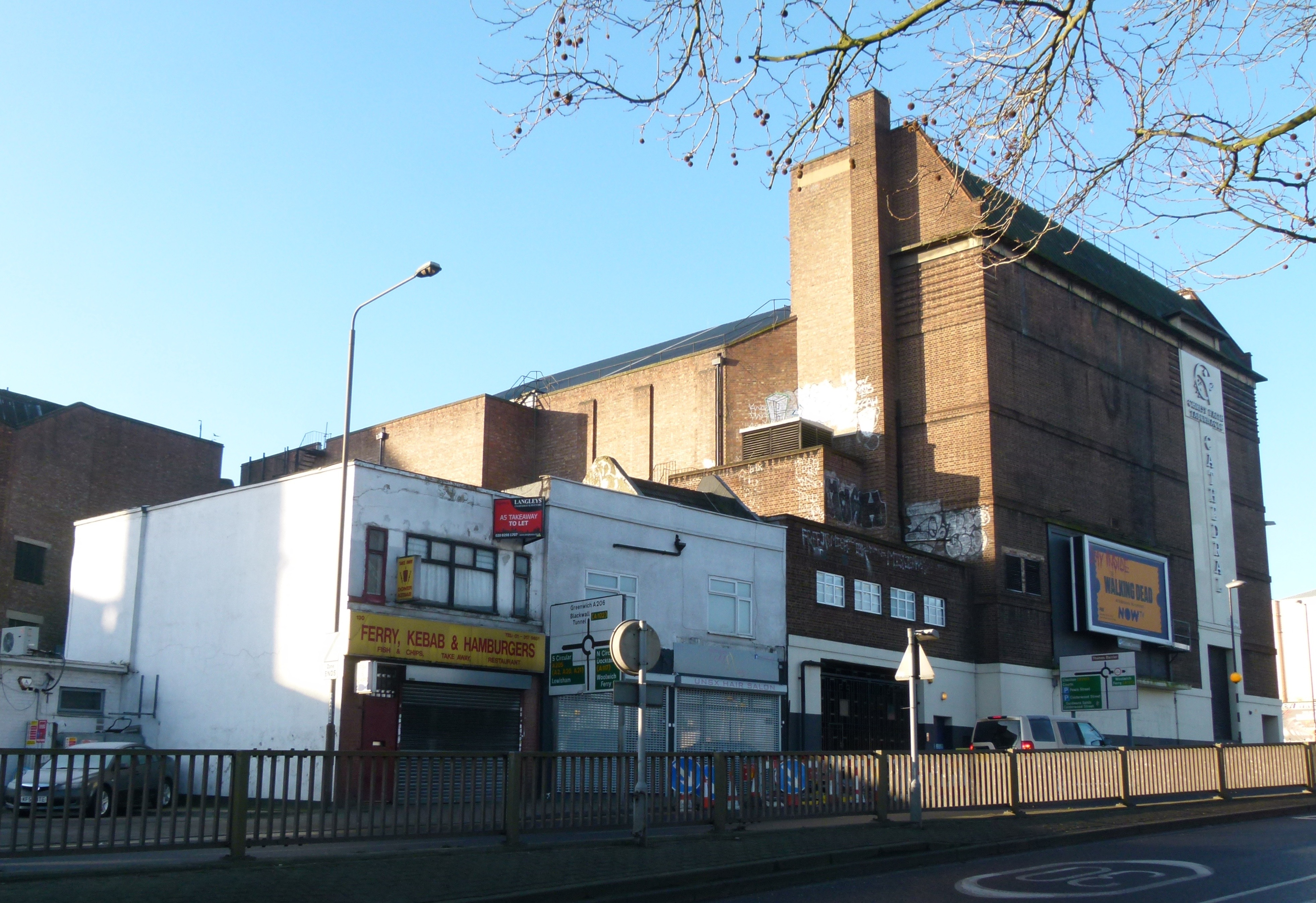
High Street shops and former Granada Cinema

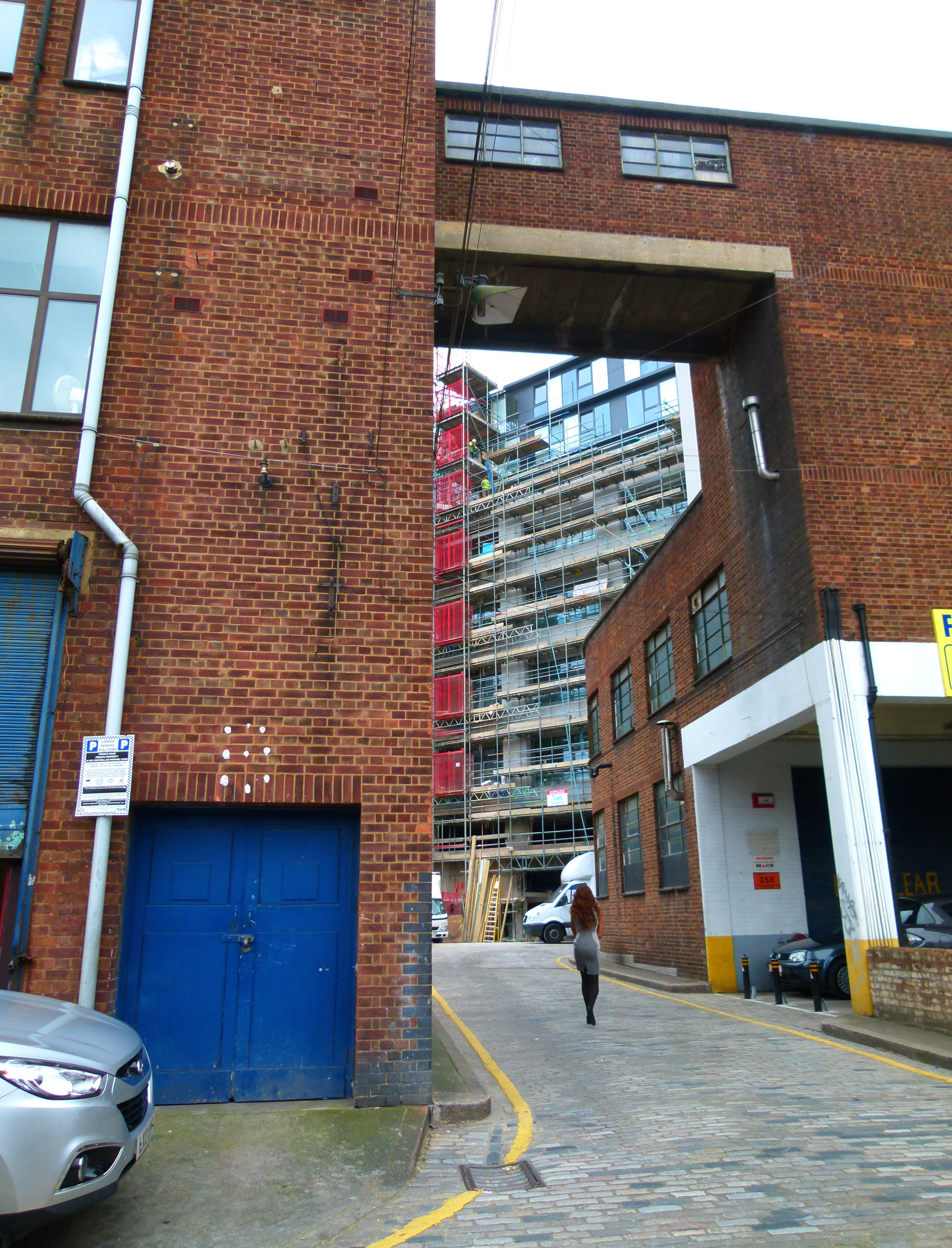
Furlongs Garage buildings on Mortgramit Square

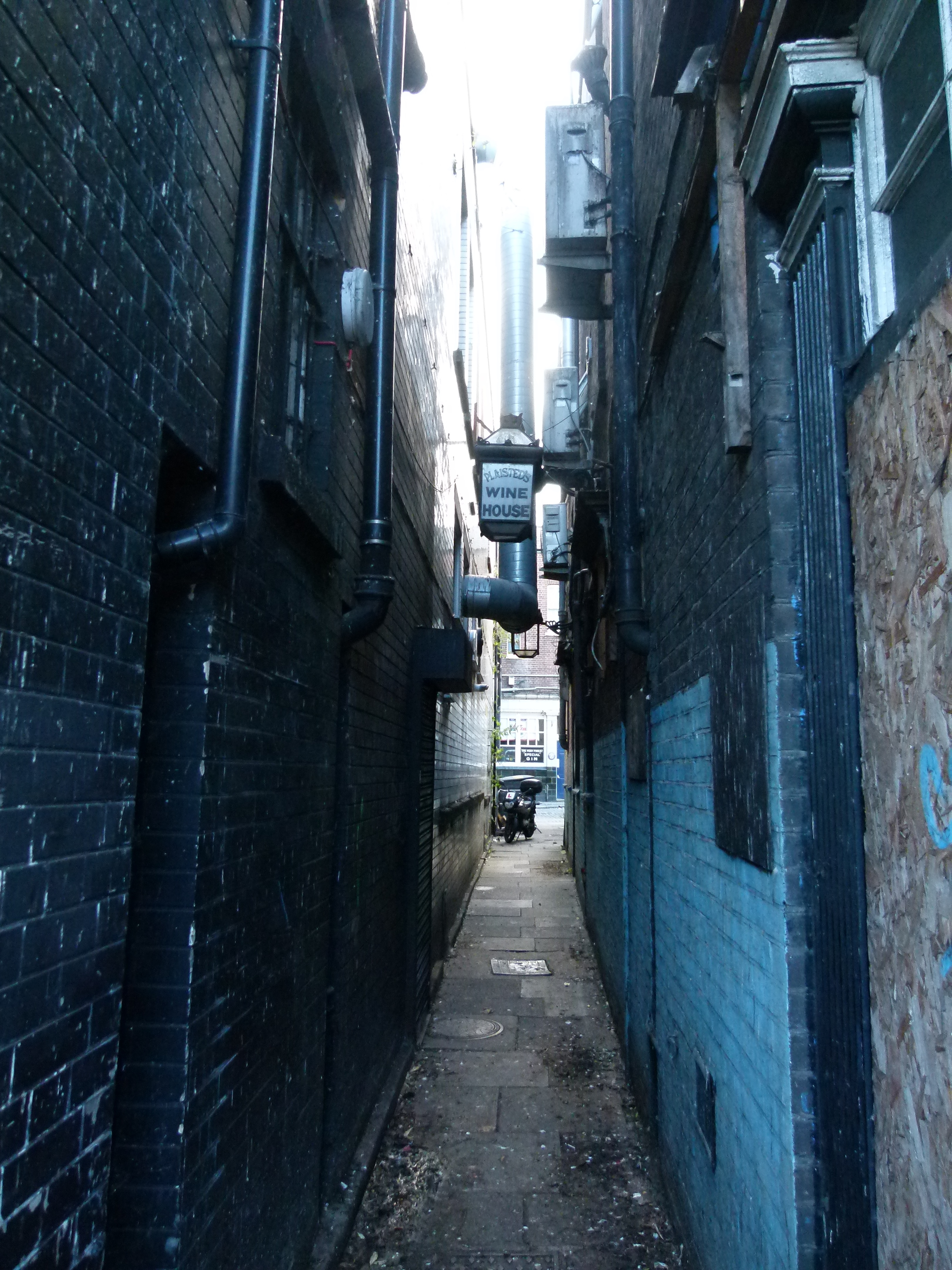
Alley leading to Dog Yard

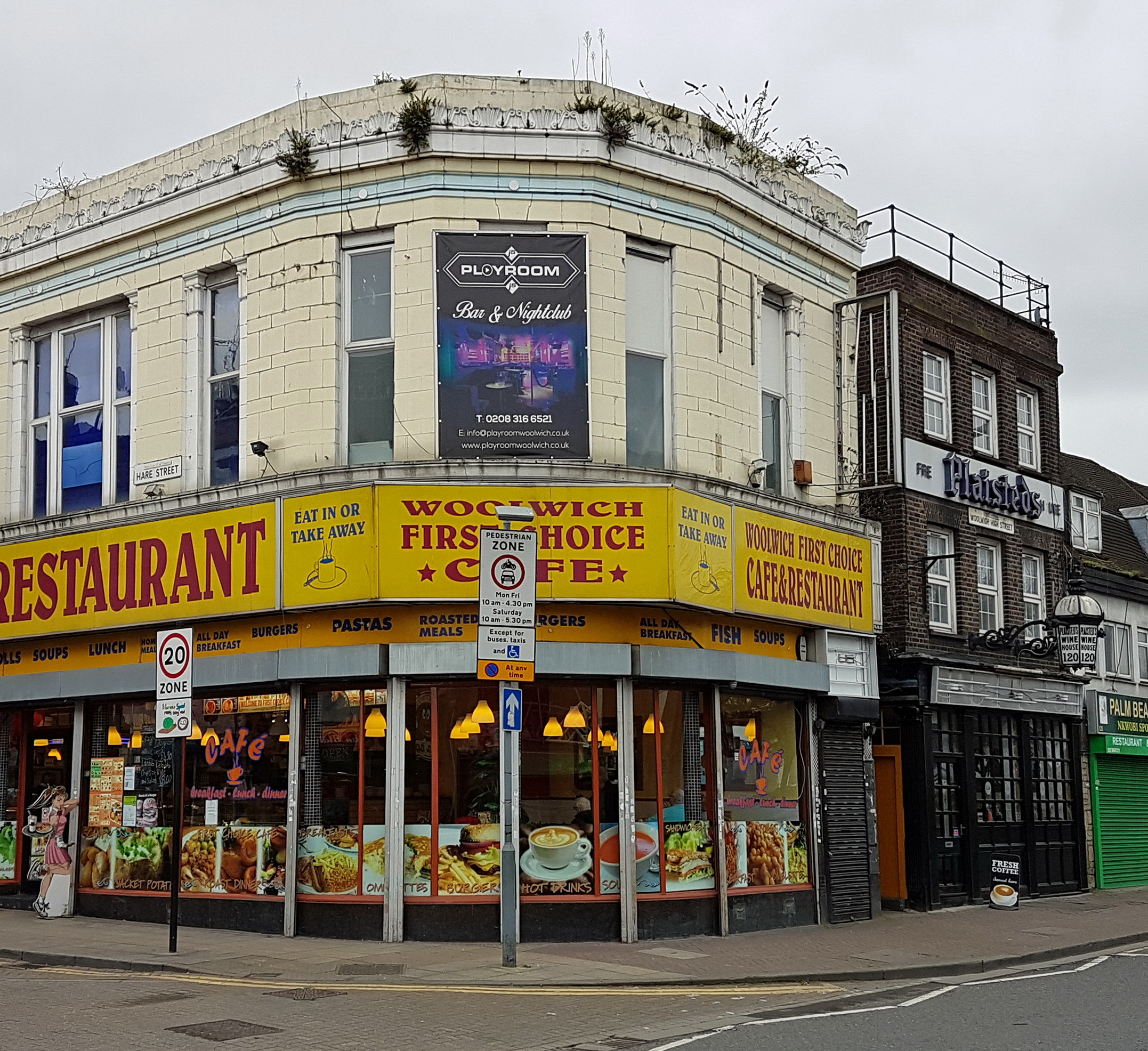
Hare Street corner and Plaisted's Wine House

=== High Street east ===
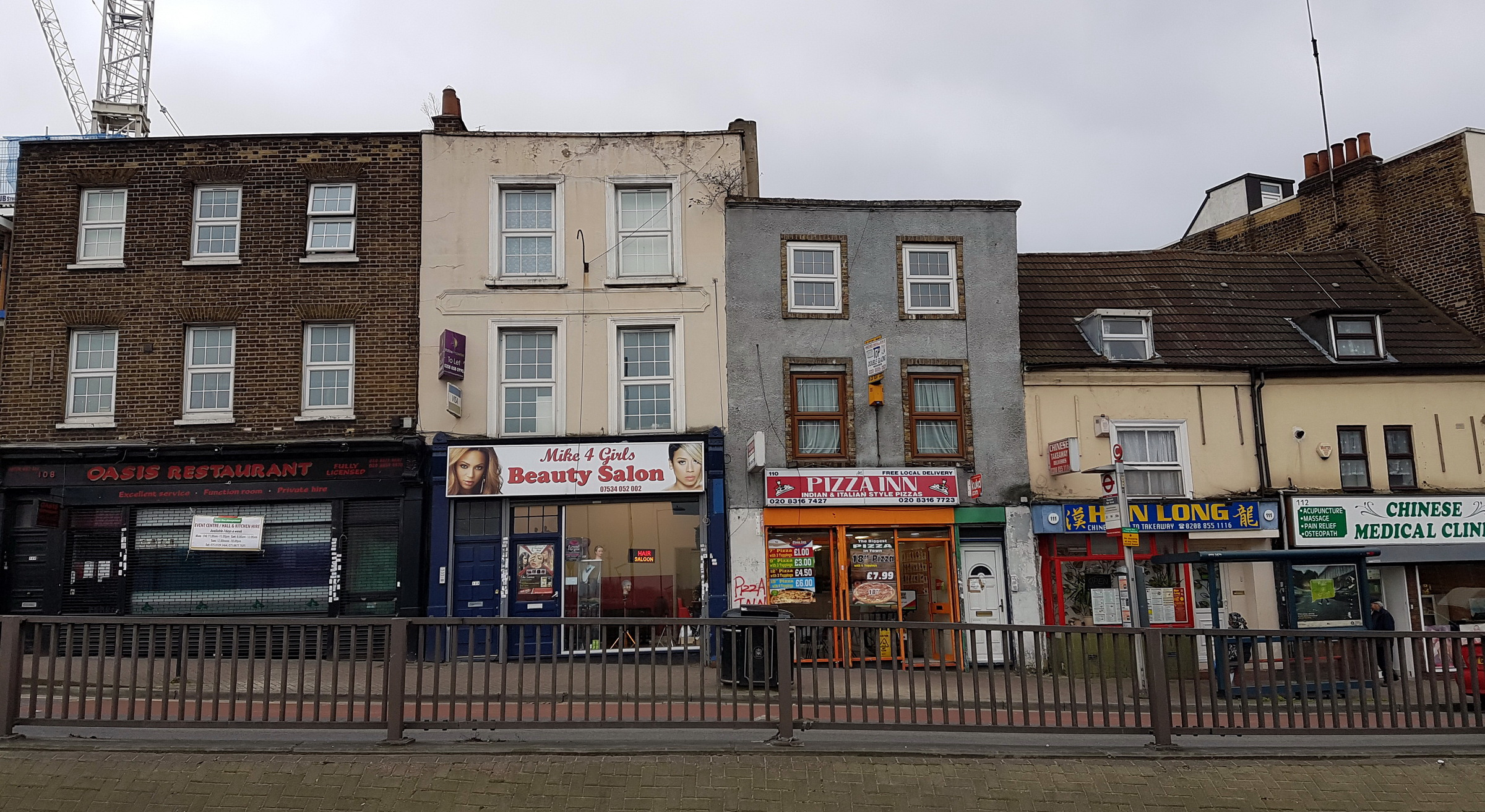
Georgian shops, nos. 108-112

The north side of the street east of the Waterfront Leisure Centre has been entirely razed and turned into a temporary car park, awaiting redevelopment as part of the Waterfront scheme. The south side of Woolwich High Street continues with a scattering of small shops, followed by the Callis Yard construction site, and the 1960s Riverside House offices. On the corner with Hare Street is a large shop of 1882 with a narrow façade on the High Street and a pedimented clock on the corner. The 18th-century house next door is much altered but its exposed brick flank on Ferry Place is original. Ferry Place, or Cock Yard until 1938, is a narrow cul-de-sac that in 1871 had 69 people living in it. Further east is Thakrar House, a five-bay building put up in the late 1850s for an outfitter. Adjacent, nos. 108-112 constitute five much-altered but essentially Georgian shop-houses. They were once located opposite Market Hill; their 18th-century occupants overlooked the market with its watch-house, pump, cage and stocks. Nos. 111-112 are probably the oldest surviving houses in Woolwich, from the early 18th century, perhaps also the smallest. Nos. 110-111 are from the late 18th and early 19th century and are one storey higher. No. 108 was rebuilt in the 1820s, of plain brick, three storeys high and three bays wide. Callis Yard was for more than a century a municipal depot. The site was largely cleared in the 2010s. A section of the old horse stables was saved and restored. In 2016-18, a cluster of mainly low-rise apartment buildings were built here, including an 18-storey residential tower. The latter stands close to a 17-storey office tower, part of Riverside House, built in 1962-63. Most of Riverside House is on Beresford Street but the anomalous and much-disliked office block forms the pivot point between the two streets. (Note: John Betjeman described Riverside House in 1965 as "an absolutely square block built solely with the intention of making money and not to make Woolwich beautiful". Saint & Guillery (2012), p. 83.)

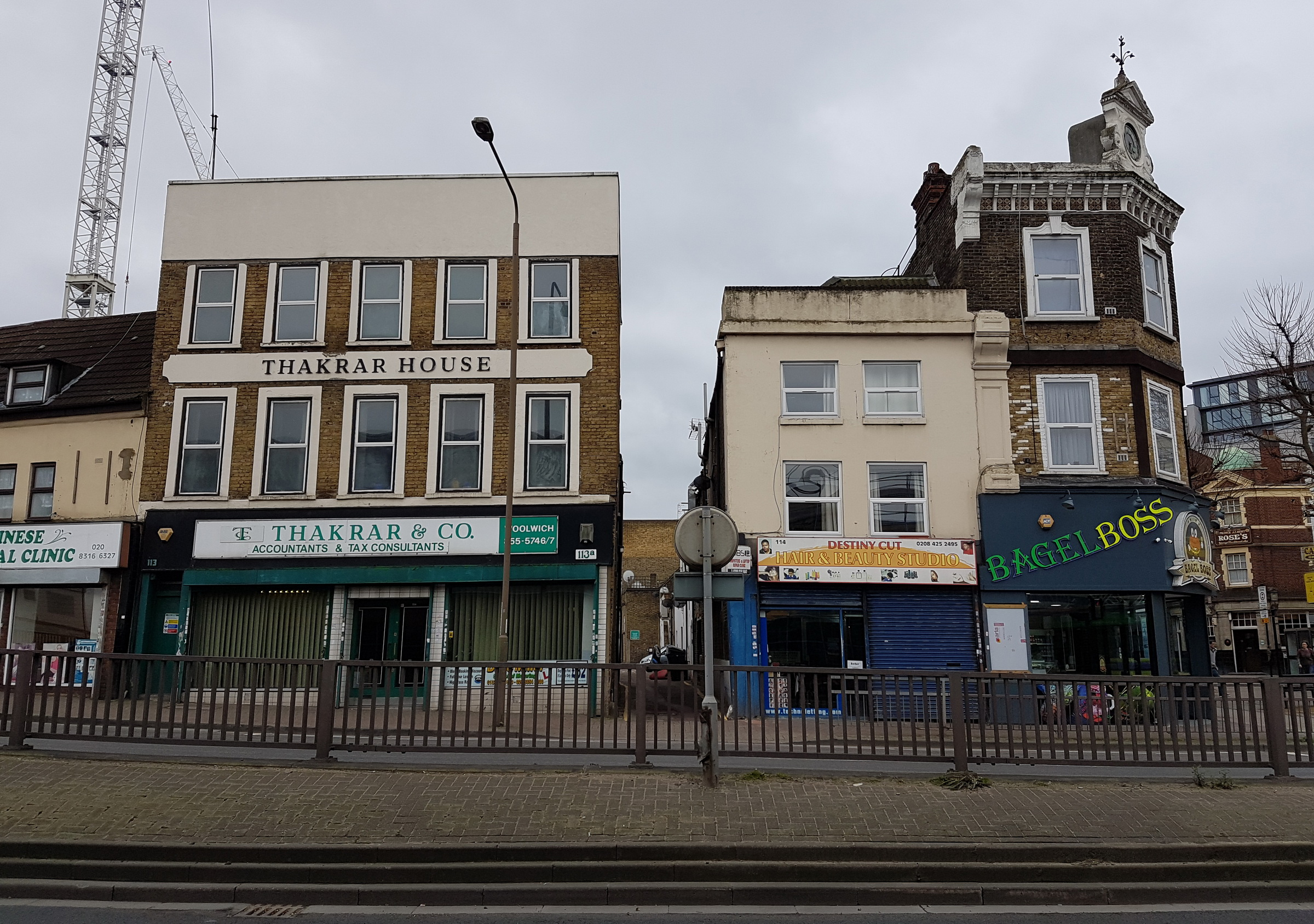
High Street shops

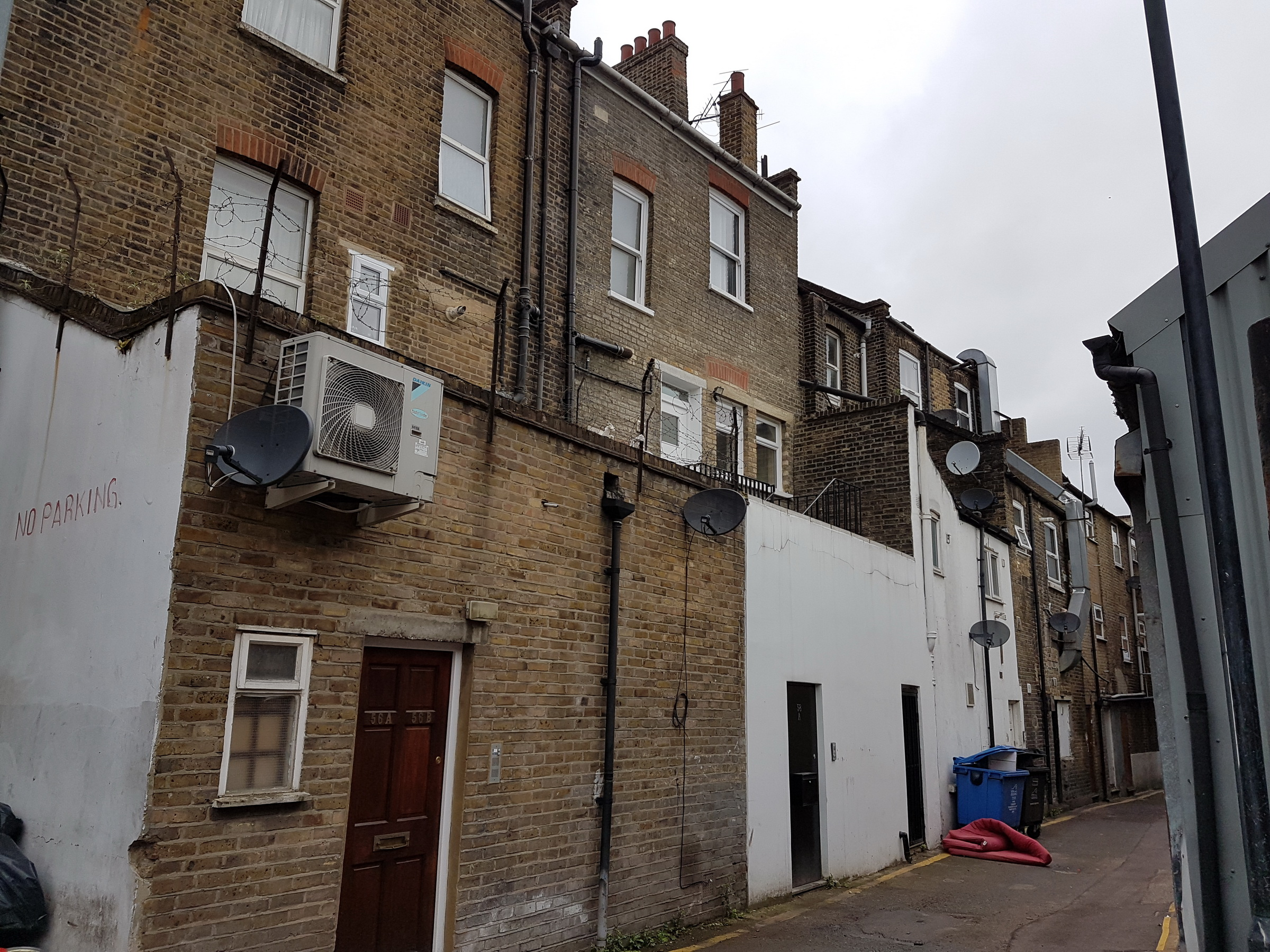
Ferry Place

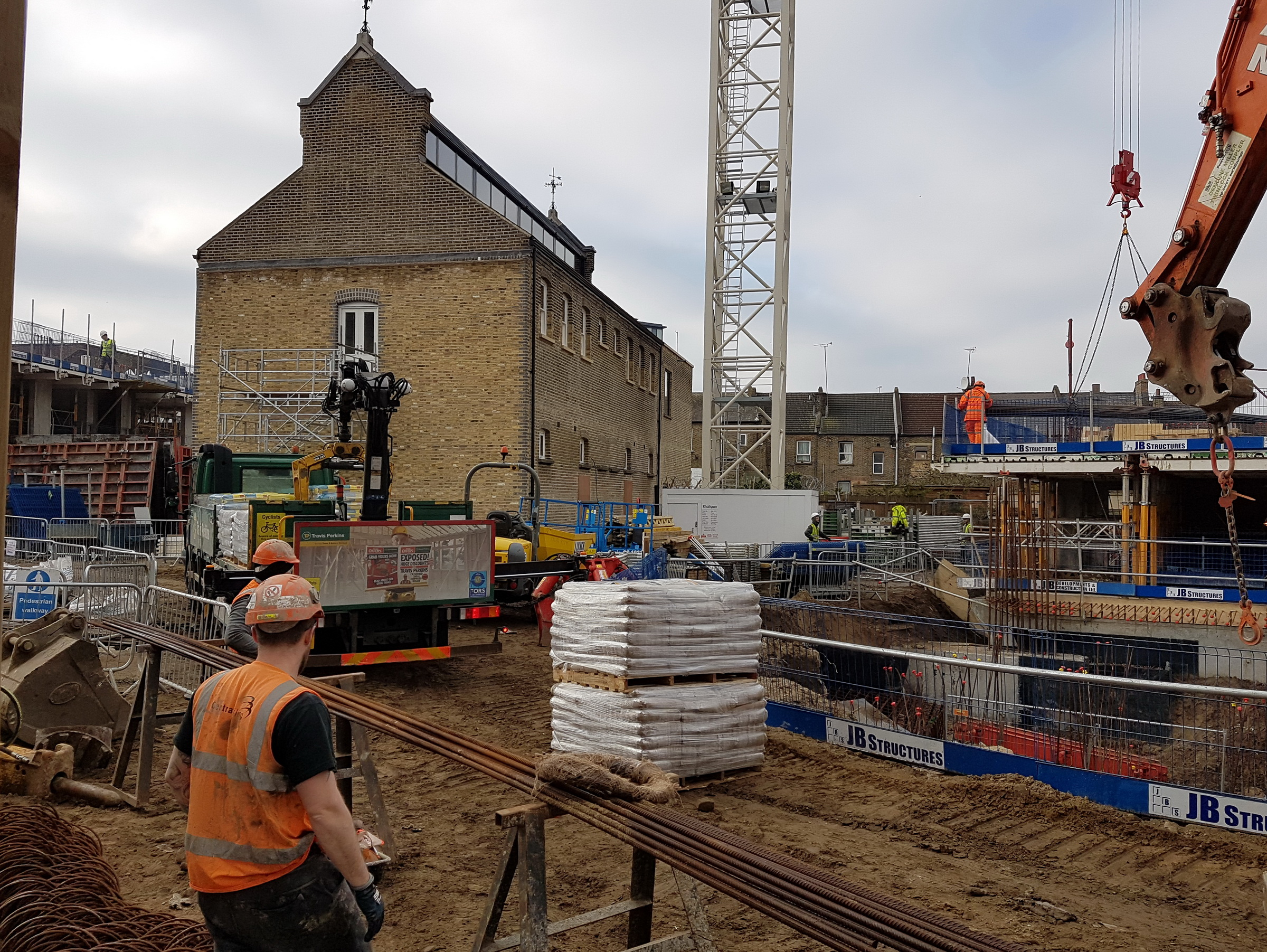
Callis Yard construction site

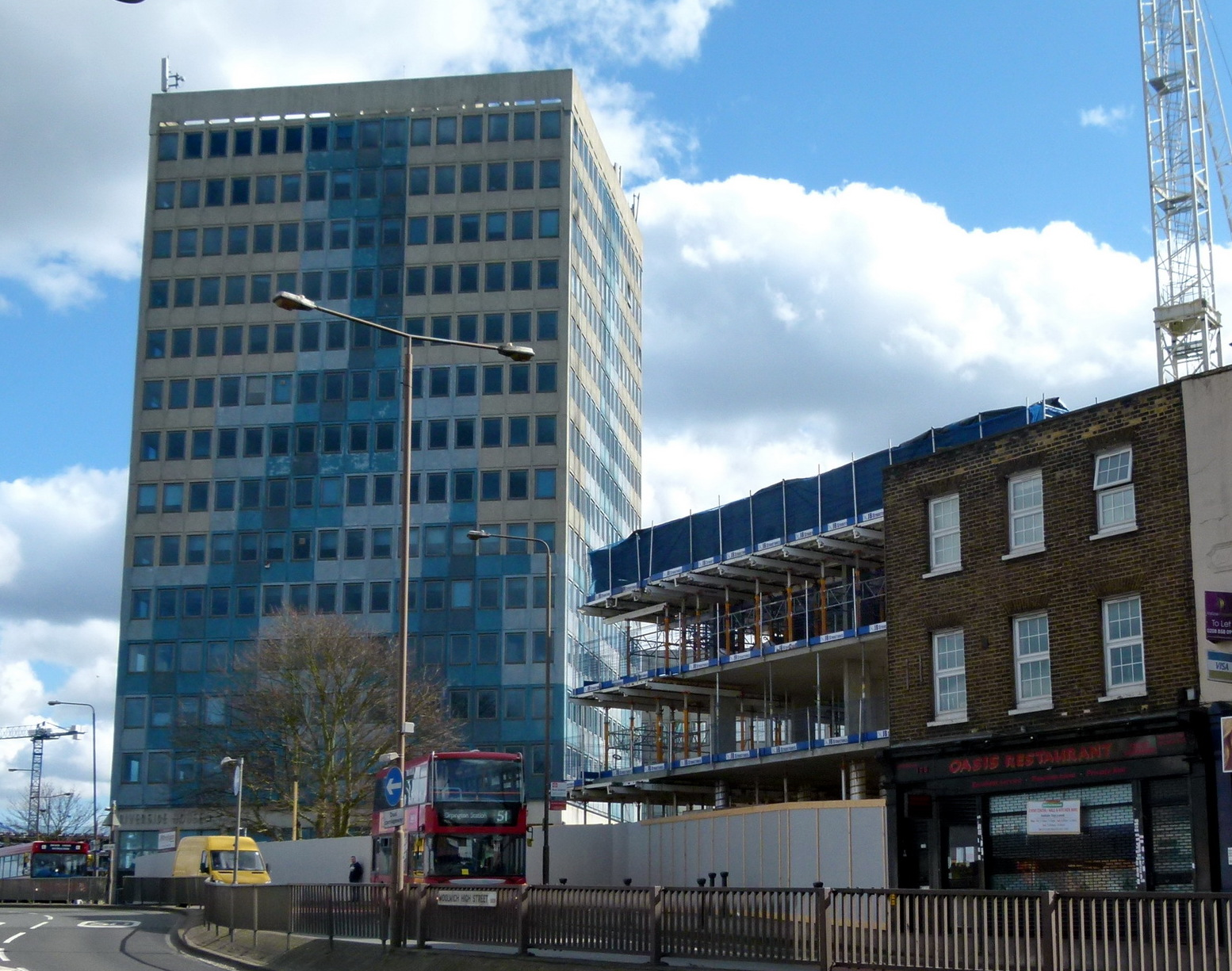
Riverside House

=== Beresford Street area ===
Not a single stone remains of the ropeyard that once dominated this area, nor are there any buildings left from the 1830s when Beresford Street was laid out. In fact, very little remains from the 1960s when the area was redeveloped as a light industrial and office estate. On both sides of the street vacant lots alternate with 20th-century buildings, some of which are destined for demolition or refurbishment. Plans by Berkeley Homes for the north side are furthest advanced. Part of this area is a park (Royal Arsenal Gardens, renamed Maribor Park around 2018), part of it a construction site. A Premier Inn hotel opened here, after much delay, in 2017. A 17-storey building is planned on the corner with Warren Lane, with taller buildings behind it, nearer to the river. A residential block with students' flats will replace the Woolwich Catholic Club, built in 1979-80. On the south side of the street, an office-to-residential conversion of Royal Sovereign House was completed in 2020. Built in 1980-81, this was originally part of a development incorporating a supermarket and a five-storey office block. The 1880s Union Street School, on the corner of Macbean Street (formerly Union Street), was demolished in 2011. Plans for redevelopment have been presented for this vacant lot, as well as for the adjacent and desolate-looking market pound.

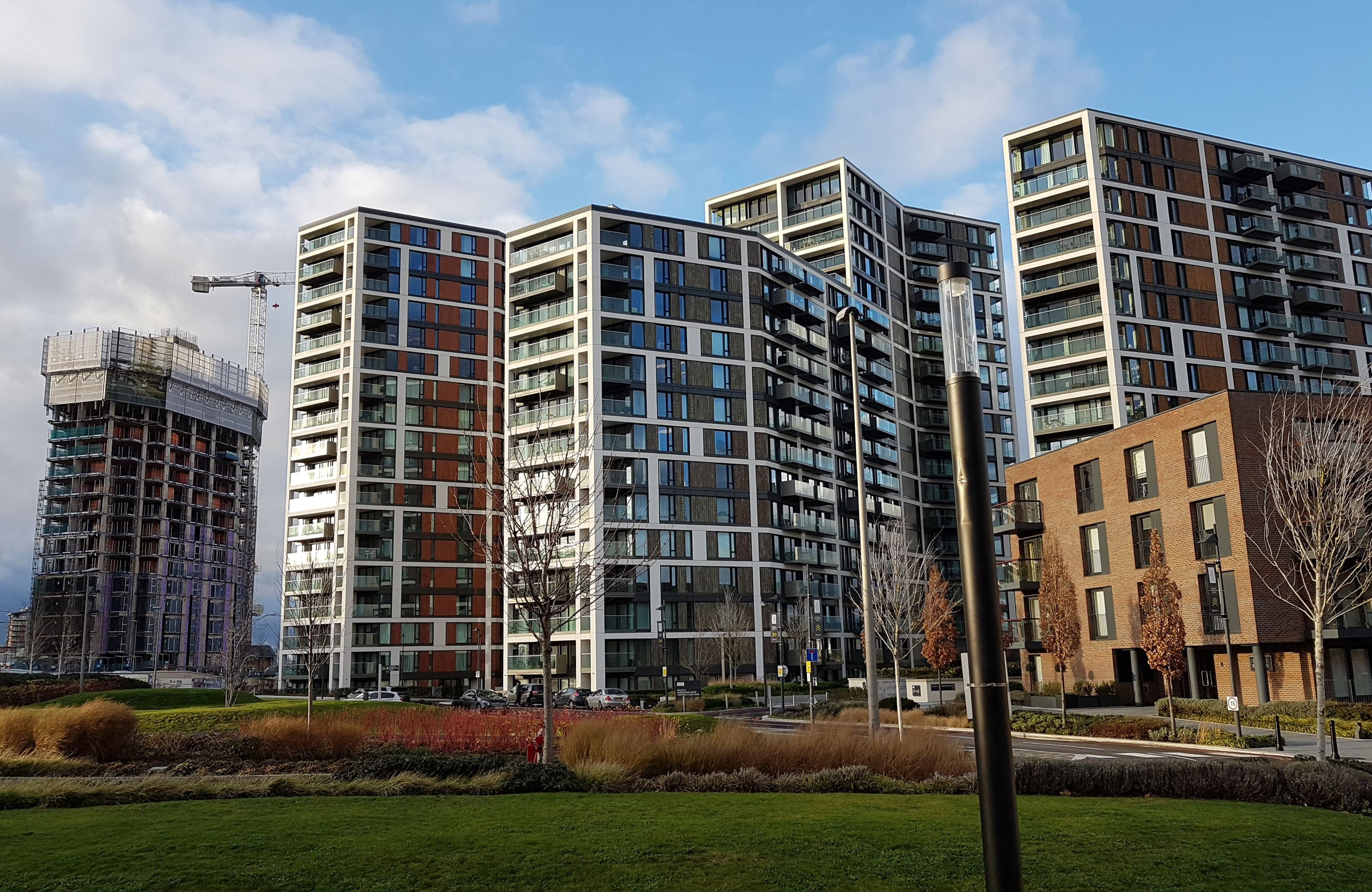
Riverside park and Waterfront development

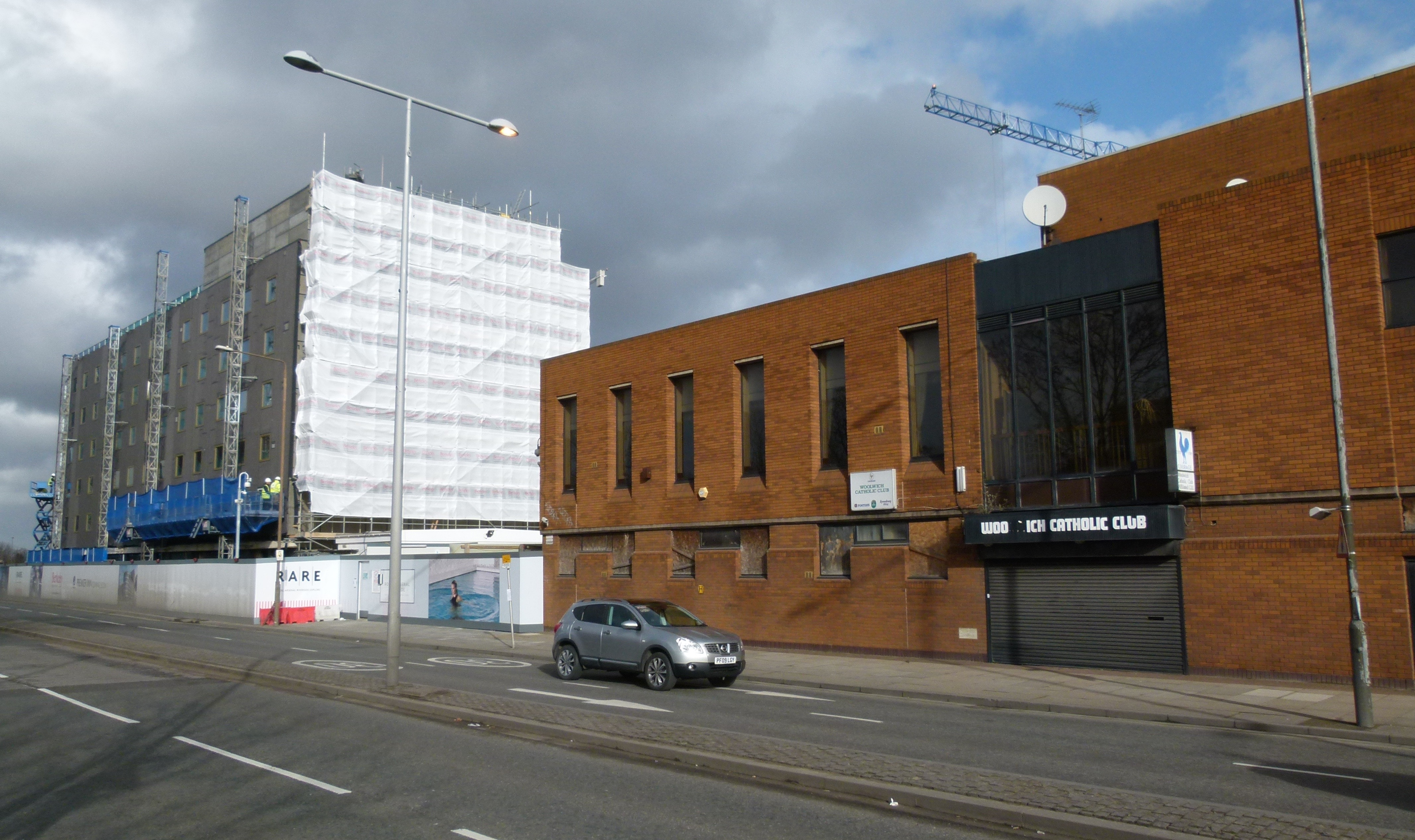
Catholic Club and hotel construction site in 2017

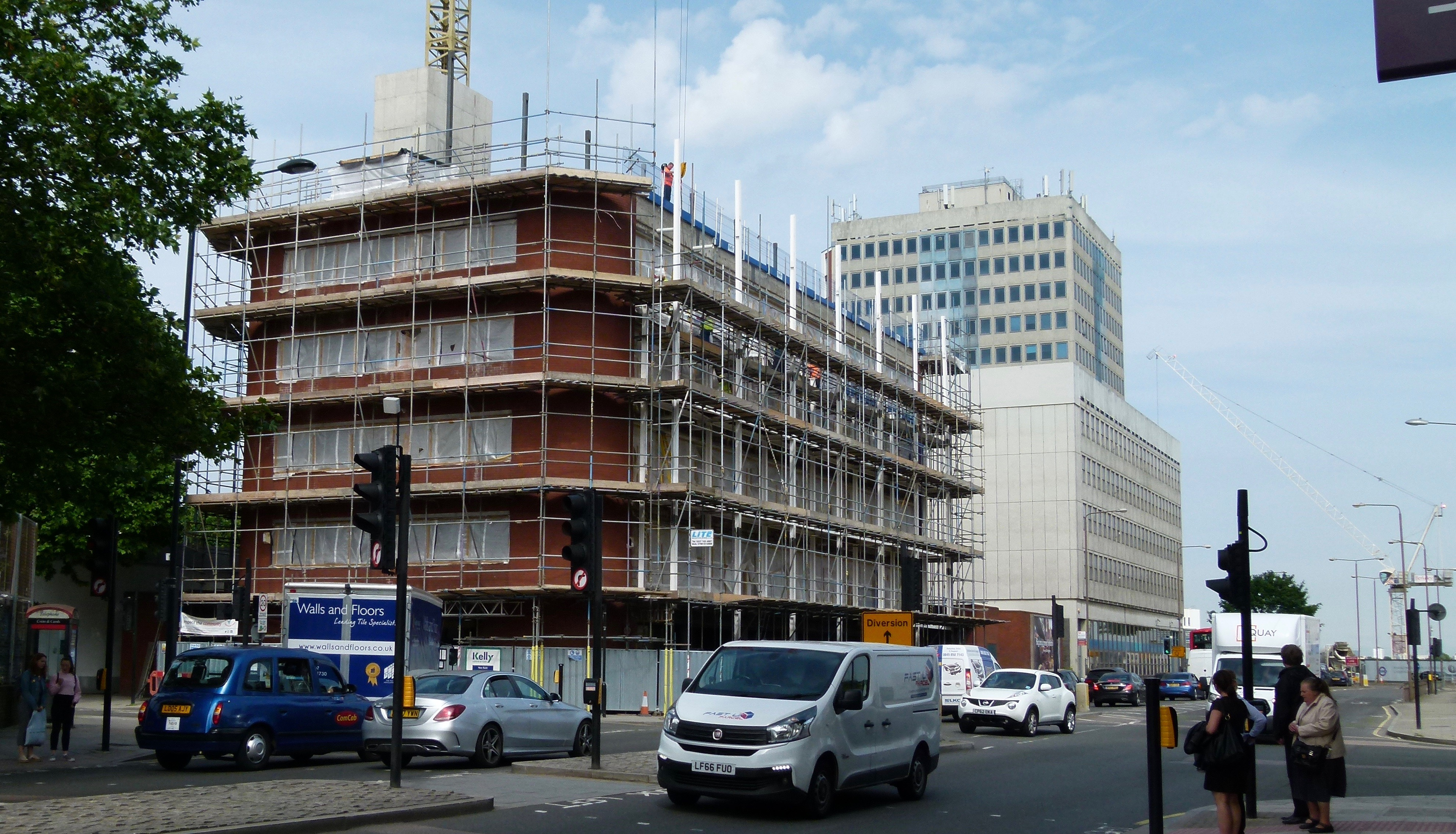
Royal Sovereign House and Riverside House in 2019

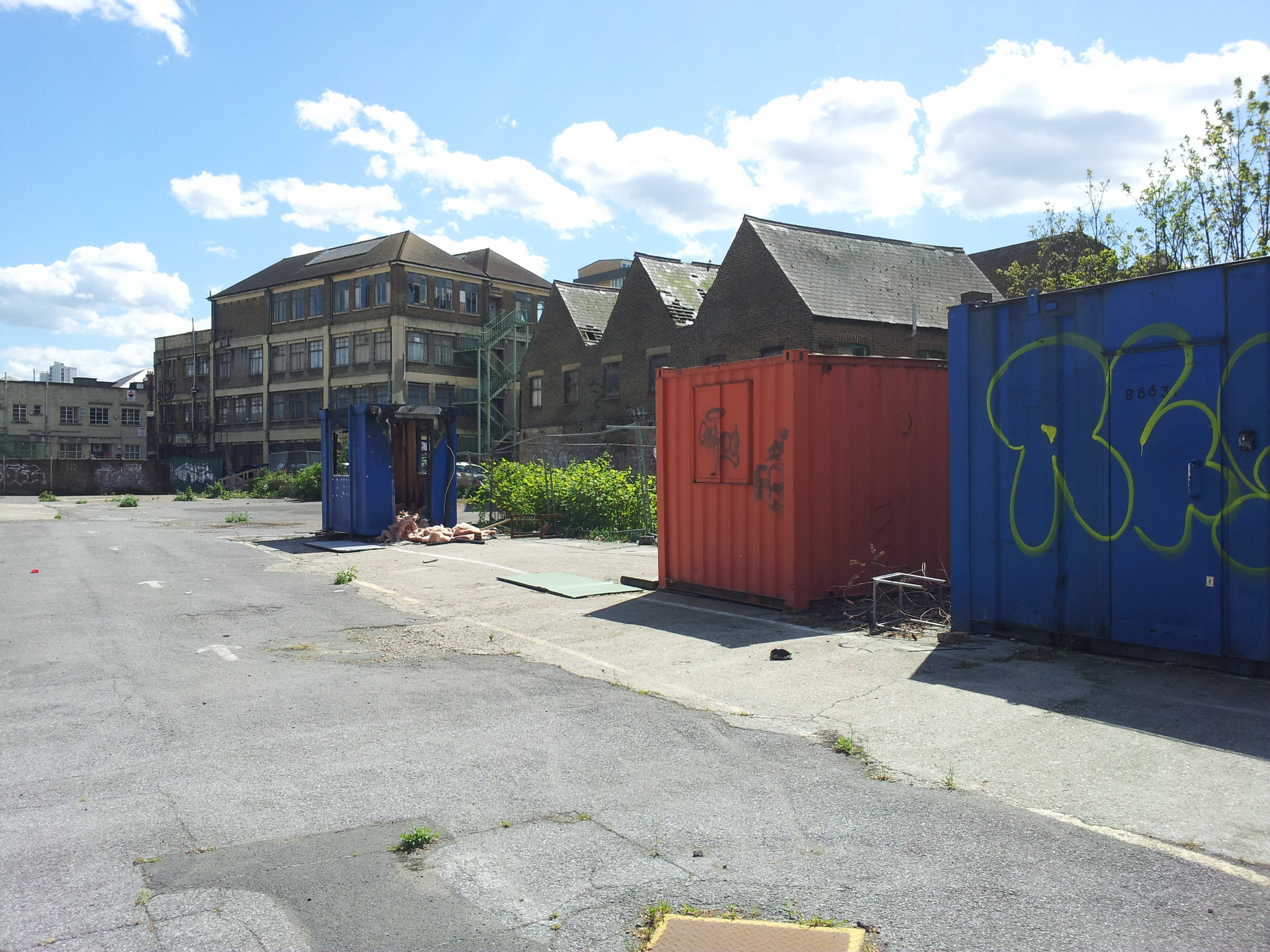
Macbean Street vacant lot

== See also ==
- Woolwich (parish)
- North Woolwich
- Woolwich Dockyard
- Royal Arsenal
- Beresford Square
- Powis Street
- Bathway Quarter

== Sources ==
Literature

- Bedford, K., Woolwich through time, Amberley Publishing, 2014. ISBN 978 1 4456 1599 8
- Saint, A., Guillery, P. (ed.), Woolwich – Survey of London, Volume 48, Yale Books, London, 2012. ISBN 978 0 300 18722 9 (online text at ucl.ac.uk)

Notes
