= Auto Stacker =

Former automated parking system in Woolwich, South East London in 1960~66

Coordinates: 51.4929°N 0.0675°E

The Auto Stacker, also known as Autostacker, was an ambitious but ill-fated automated parking system in Woolwich, South East London in the early 1960s. The project was initiated by Woolwich Borough Council but failed to work and was demolished in 1965–66.

The Auto Stacker was an automated system for parking cars, and effectively an automated multi-storey car park, using a combination of conveyor belts, lifts and dollies to move vehicles from ground level to one of 256 car park spaces. It was situated above a car showroom, workshop and petrol station on Beresford Street, on the site of the former Empire Theatre. Being situated along the A206 road, close to Woolwich market (Beresford Square) and the town's main shopping street (Powis Street), it was thought that the Auto Stacker, along with the introduction of parking meters, would solve the town's parking problems.

The eight-storey Auto Stacker was designed by T. and P. Braddock and built by Mitchell Engineering Company, in collaboration with Shell-Mex & BP. It was built in 1960–61 at a cost of £100,000. It was constructed more or less simultaneously with the comparable Zidpark at Southwark Bridge, a private enterprise. The Woolwich Auto Stacker was officially opened by Princess Margaret on 11 May 1961. At the opening ceremony, the demonstration vehicle got stuck and had to be manhandled in. The mechanism failed to work that evening for Fyfe Robertson's Tonight television show, and the Auto Stacker never functioned properly; it was abandoned within months in 1961 and a few years later demolished at a cost of £60,000.
