= Powis Street =

Street in Woolwich, London, England

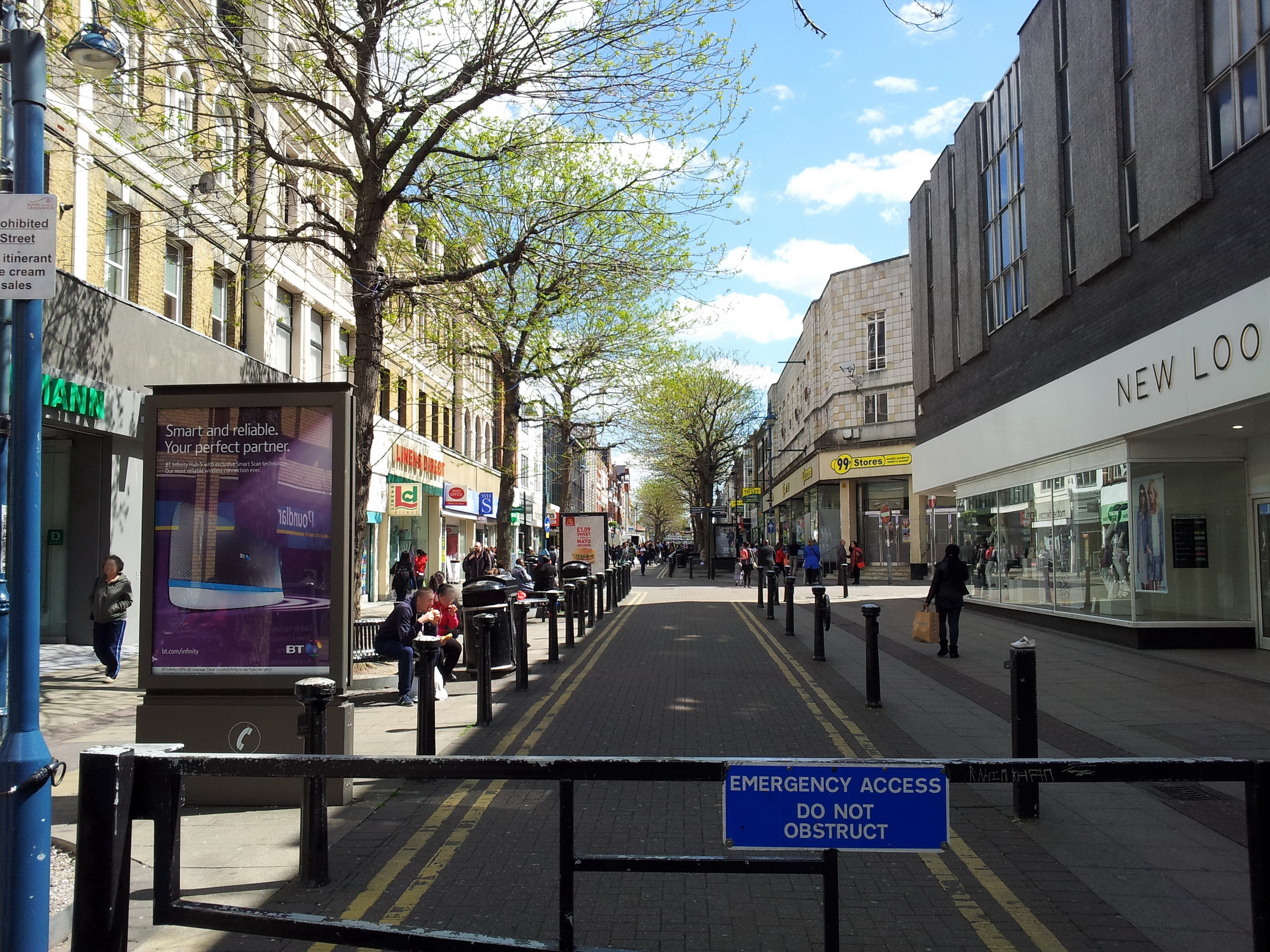

- Location within Greater London
- Maintained by: Greenwich London Borough Council
- Location: Woolwich, south east London
- Postal code: SE18
- Nearest metro station: Woolwich Arsenal
- Coordinates: 51.491111°N 0.069167°E
- west end: John Wilson Street, or A205, and Woolwich High Street, or A206
- east end: Green's End, Beresford Square

Construction
- Construction start: 1782 (road), 1798 (built environment)
- Completed: 1821

Other
- Known for: Royal Arsenal Co-operative Society buildings, Granada Cinema, Woolwich
- Status: Partly pedestrianised shopping street

Powis Street is a partly pedestrianised shopping street in Woolwich in the Royal Borough of Greenwich, south-east London, England. It was laid out in the late 18th century and was named after the Powis brothers, who developed most of the land in this part of the town. The street has been rebuilt several times but has retained some notable examples of late-Victorian and Art Deco architecture. Since 2019 the street is part of a conservation area.

== Location ==
Powis Street is situated in central Woolwich, to the south of, and more or less parallel to the main thoroughfare, the A206 dual carriageway, locally known as Woolwich High Street and Beresford Street. The western end of the street meets the South Circular Road (A205) at Parson's Hill. At its eastern end are the town's two main squares, Beresford Square and General Gordon Square. This is also where Woolwich Arsenal railway and DLR stations are situated, not far from the Elizabeth line station. Since the pedestrianisation of the street, busses are only allowed to pass through a small section of the street but there are many bus-stops in the vicinity, mostly around the stations. A multi-storey carpark exists in Monk Street / Calderwood Street. Other car parks are available at the west end of Powis Street and in Macbean Street.

== History ==
=== 18th century ===
Up to the late 18th century, the military and naval town of Woolwich was largely situated along the High Street, and to the north of that street along the banks of the river Thames, crammed in between Woolwich Dockyard and The Warren (later the Royal Arsenal). Most shops in Old Woolwich would have been along the High Street, with a market at Market Hill (near Bell Water Gate). After numerous redevelopments, very little of historic value remains here.

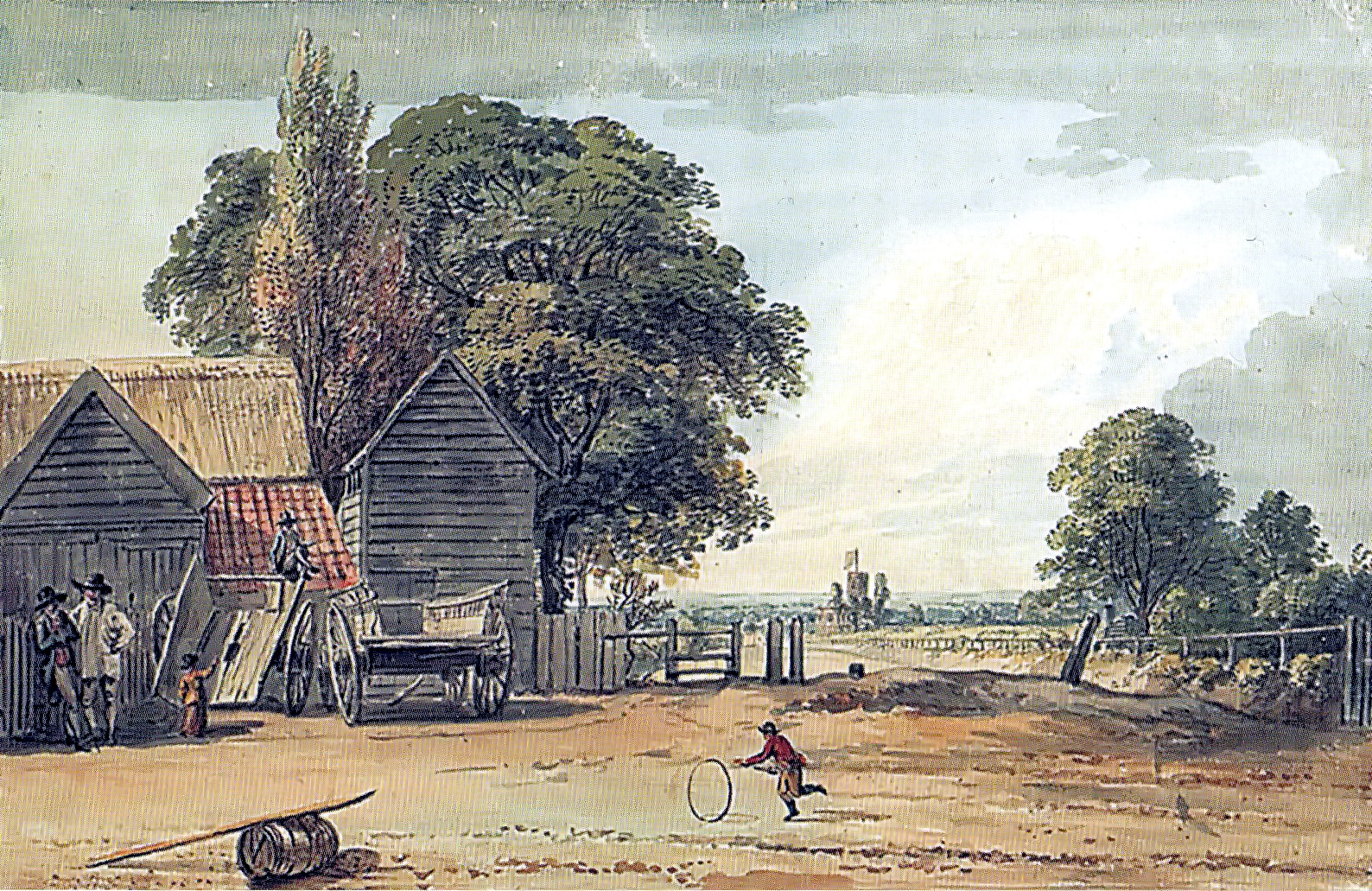
Powis Street as a dirt road, from the east. Paul Sandby, 1783

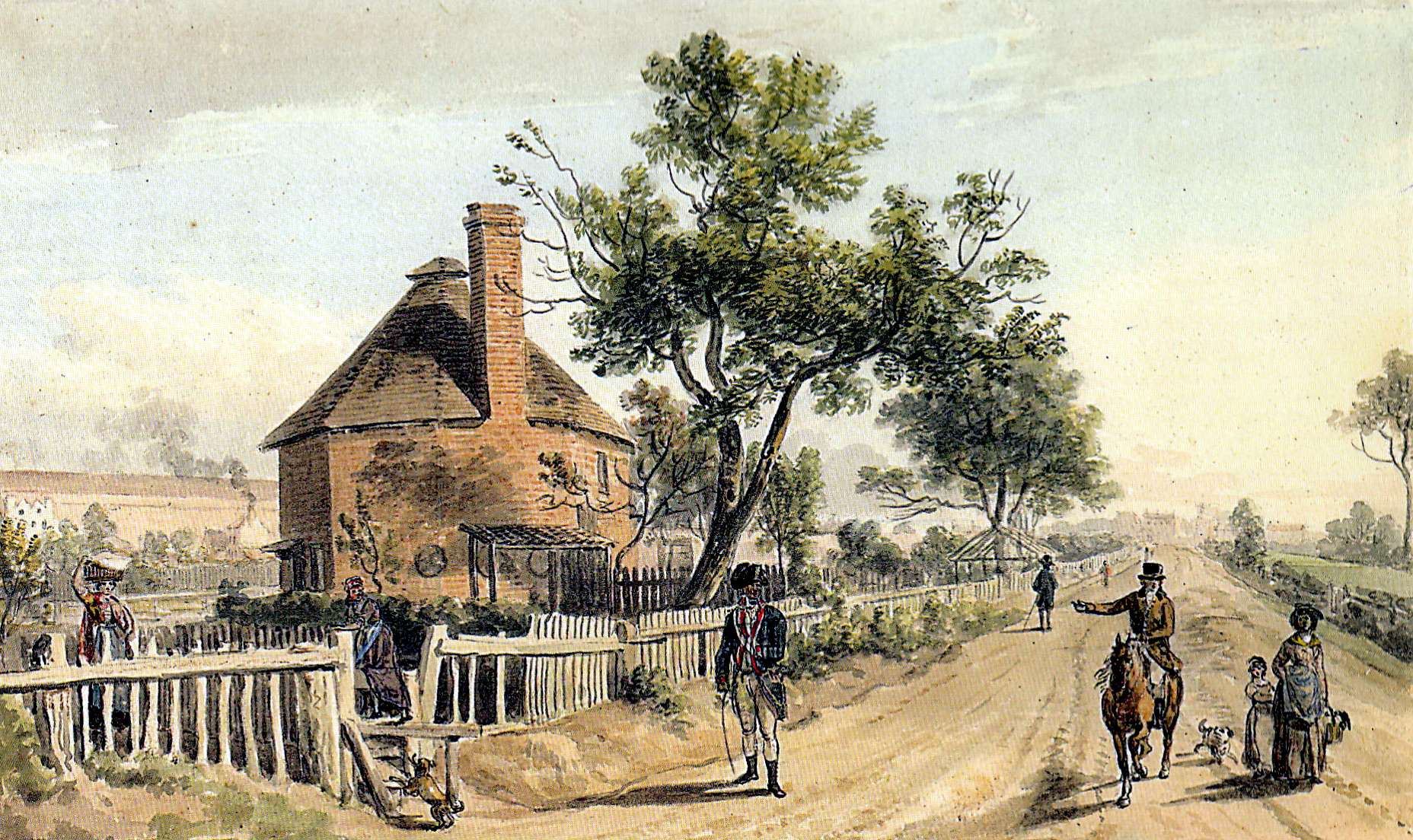
The same dirt track from the west, with the octagonal building

The area that presently forms the commercial heart of Woolwich - south of Old Woolwich, around Powis Street, Beresford Square and General Gordon Square - was still largely rural, with a small cluster of cottages around Green's End and the so-called New Road (Woolwich New Road). To the north and east of the future Powis Street were the Royal Ropeyard and some gardens; to the south and west lay virgin land. As the town was growing rapidly - from 6,500 in 1720 to almost 17,000 in 1811 - the need arose for a new town centre and the obvious location was the area south of the ropeyard, more or less between the old town and the main entrance of the Arsenal.

In 1782, the Powis brothers, Greenwich brewers, took a lease of 43 acres of these fields which were then part of the Bowater Estate. (Note: The Powis brothers, William, Thomas and Richard, were Greenwich beer brewers who also in 1782 took over the Dog Yard brewery and a number of public houses around Woolwich. William moved to Woolwich and became a member of the Vestry in 1784. Saint & Guillery (2012), p. 191.) Shortly afterwards a road was laid out here. It connected Green's End and the parish church of St Mary Magdalene, providing an alternative to the busy High Street. The artist Paul Sandby, who lived in Woolwich, painted the road in its earliest appearance. A watercolour of 1783 shows the road from Green's End as no more than a dirt track. Another watercolour by Sandby shows the same area from the west with the ropeyard clearly visible to the north of the road. An octagonal house stood at its west end (where the Art Deco co-op building stands now), perhaps an outbuilding of the Dog Yard brewery on the High Street, or a lavoir. A laundress lived there in 1841. In 1853 it was demolished.

As the lease that the Powis brothers took out was only for 22 years, the land was not profitable for development and, apart from the road, very little happened until 1799, when a 99-year development lease was signed. Plans were made to fill in the entire area of 43 acres with streets and houses. In fact, work had already started in 1798. In less than 30 years the project would be completed, presenting Woolwich with a municipal precinct, the area now known as Bathway Quarter, and a new shopping precinct, the Powis and Hare Street area.

=== 19th century ===
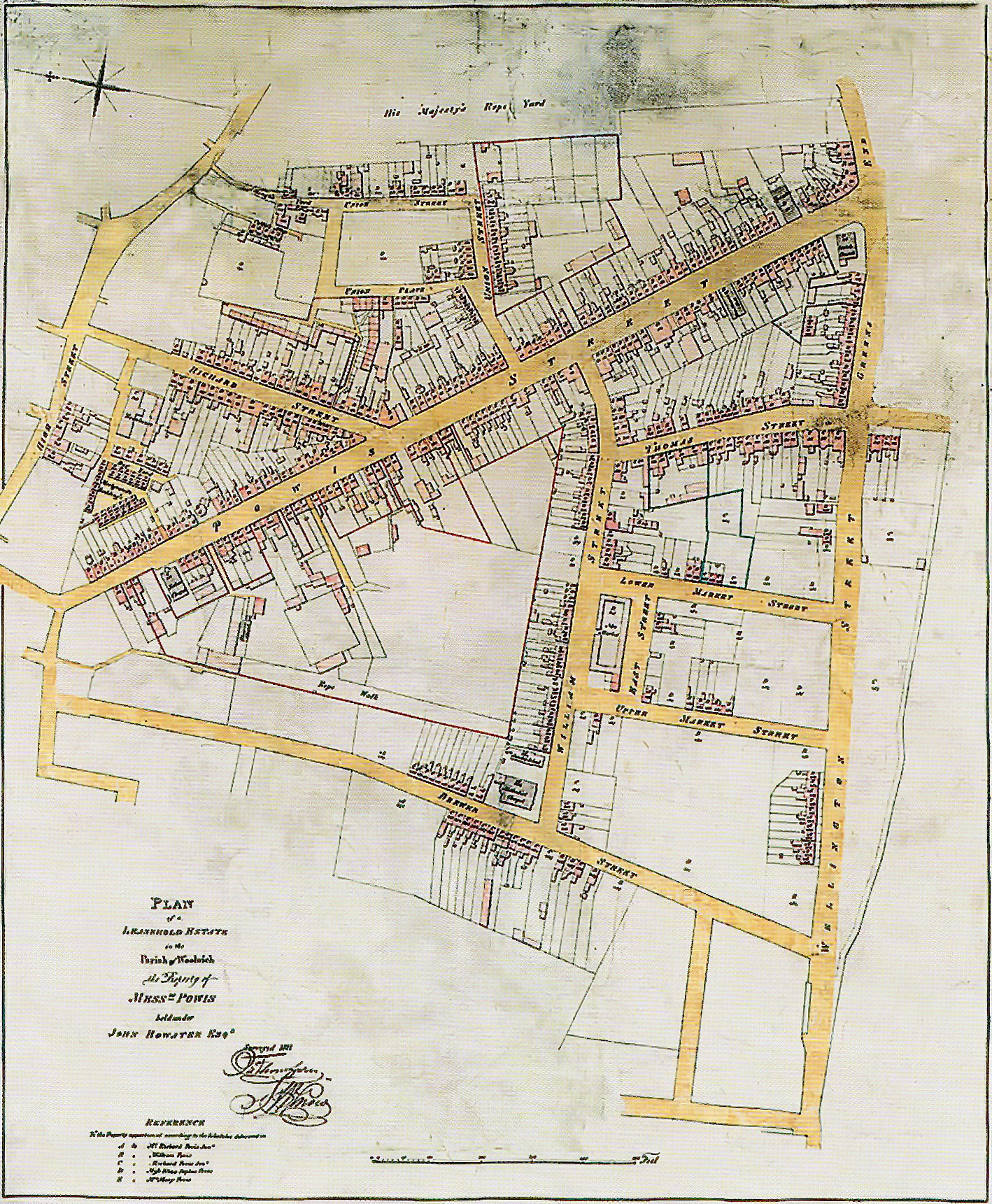
The Powis estate in 1825

The development of the Powis estate went smoothly during the Napoleonic Wars, because in Woolwich wartime brought prosperity. In 1810 there were already 141 houses in Powis Street. The long period of peace after the Battle of Waterloo brought hardship and population decline. Powis Street (along with Hare Street, then Richard Street) was in 1821 the first street to be finished, with a total of 158 houses built. Most houses were two storeys high, occasionally three. The narrowest frontages measured 4.3 m. Some were put up by shipwrights from Woolwich Dockyard, and then sub-leased. From the beginning there were shops in Powis Street. After rebuilding Kent House in the 1830s, Garrett's, a draper's, was the largest shop. There were also several chapels, a Freemasons' hall, a theater and a number of public houses, two of which, the Shakespeare and the Star & Garter, were owned by the Powis brothers. In the late 1840s around 1,000 people lived in Powis Street. Most shops were at the east end of the street, close to Woolwich market and the railway station, which opened in 1849. At this time Woolwich was already considered "the emporium for all the surrounding towns and villages." Compared to the High Street, Powis Street shops were smart and fashionable.

In 1827 Henry Hudson Church was born in Powis Street. Church became a prominent architect and surveyor in Woolwich. In the early 1860s he laid out new streets in the area between Powis Street and the Bathway Quarter, where the railway had cut through. The streets were all named after members of the Powis family: Monk Street, Clara Place and Eleanor Road (now Barnard Close). In the 1890s Church was responsible for the rebuilding of most of the commercial buildings in Powis Street. His style has been characterized as "conservative but eclectic, clumsy but lively." The redevelopment of Powis street was stimulated, strangely enough, by the impending end of the Powis lease in 1898. The owner of the freehold, Maj. Robert Alexander Ogilby, encouraged rebuilding by granting favourable new leases to those who did. Around 1890, 75% of the buildings in Powis Street were commercial, although rarely exclusively so. There were 39 drapers' and milliners' shops in central Woolwich, most of them in Powis Street. The west end of the street had remained largely residential but that changed when the Royal Arsenal Co-operative Society (RACS, established in 1868) started its formidable expansion here at the beginning of the new century. From the early 1880s until 1908 trams ran along Powis Street.

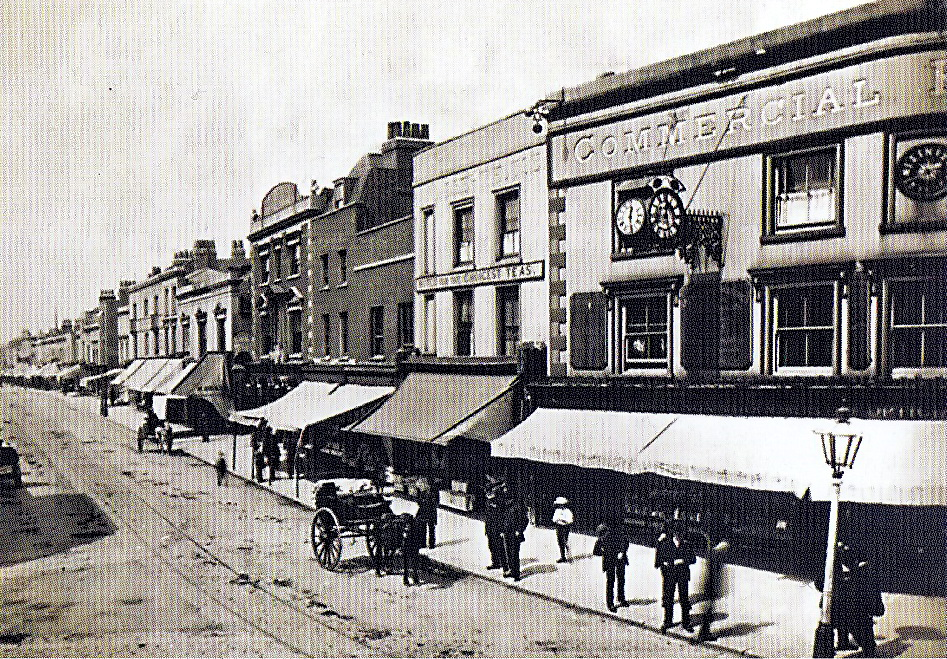
North east section, c 1890

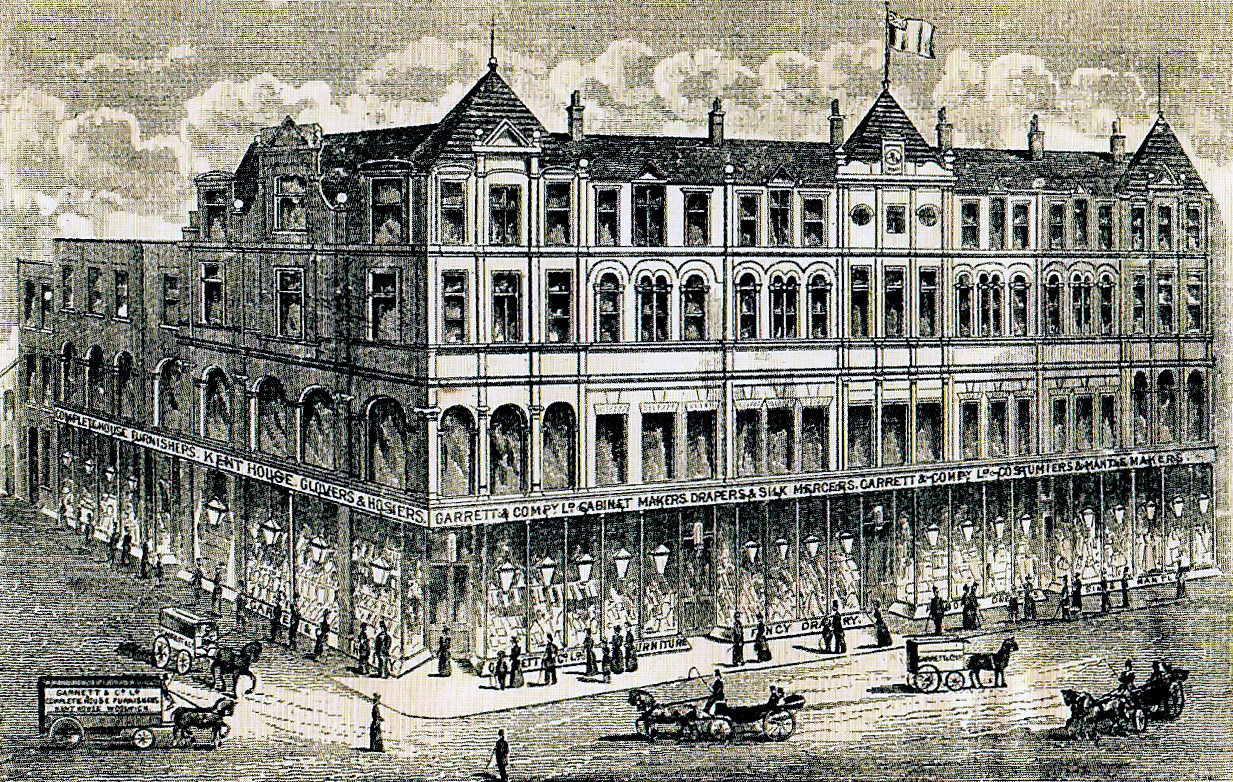
Kent House (Garrett's), 1898

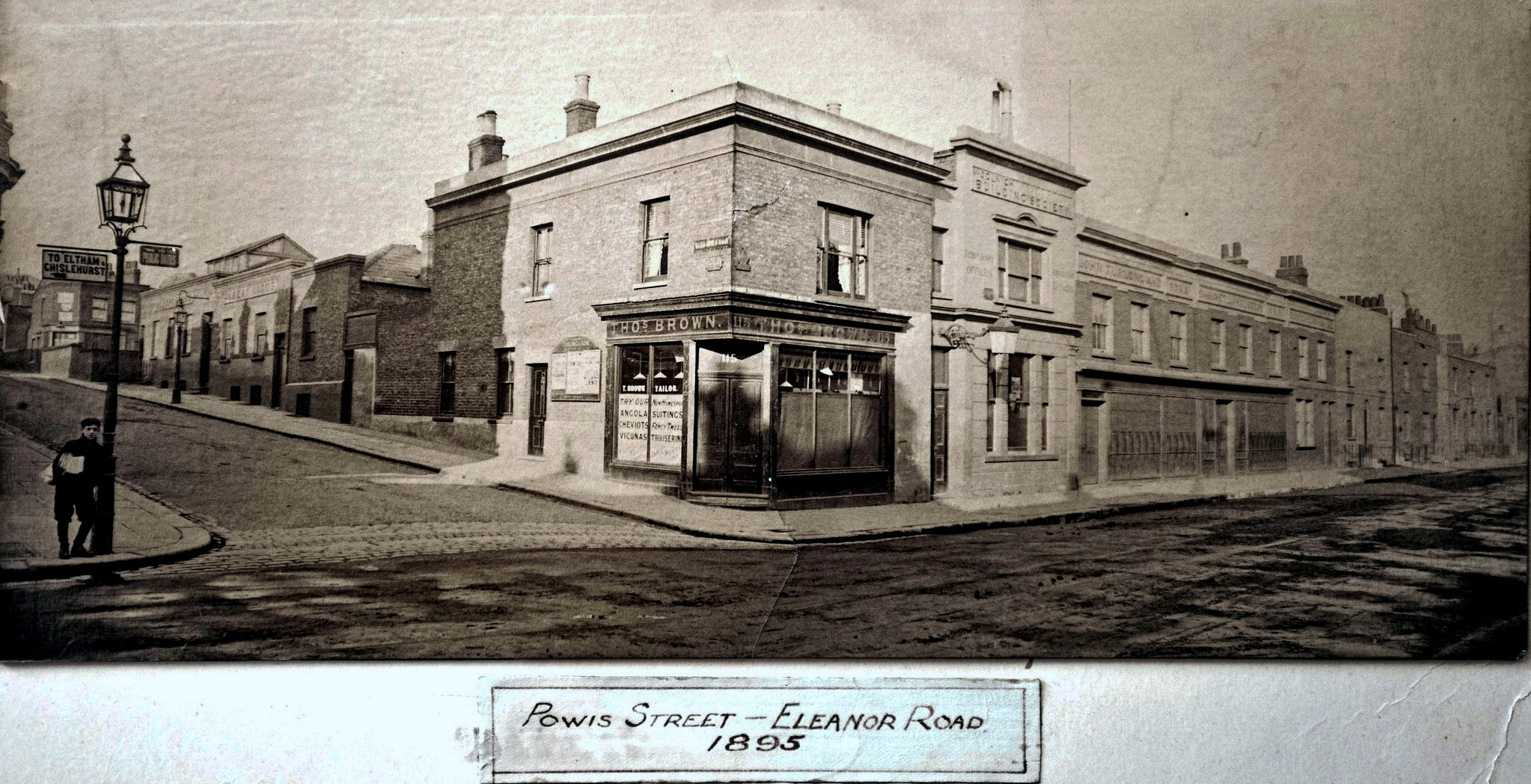
South west block, 1895

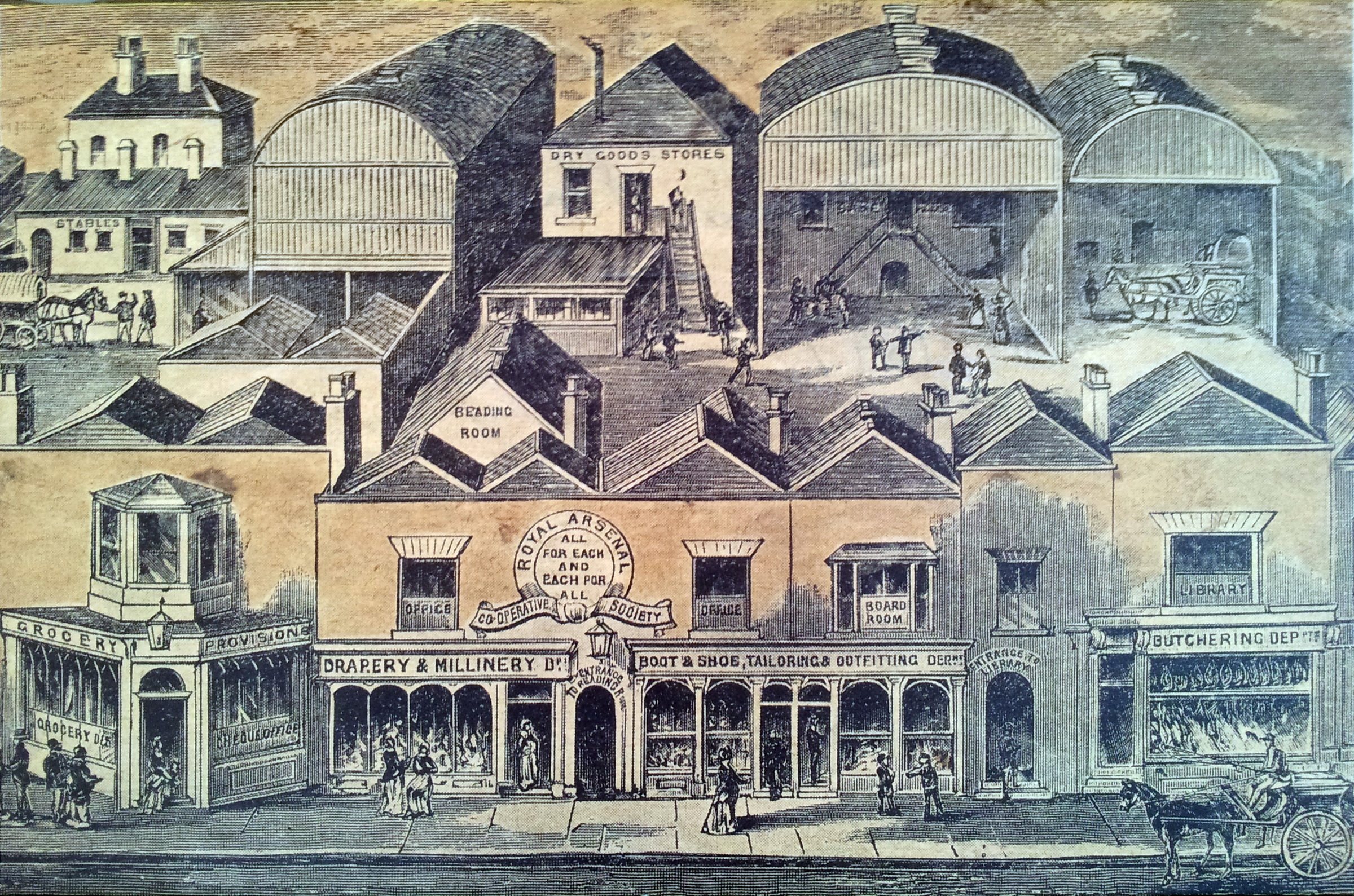
Co-op buildings, 1884

=== 20th and 21st century ===
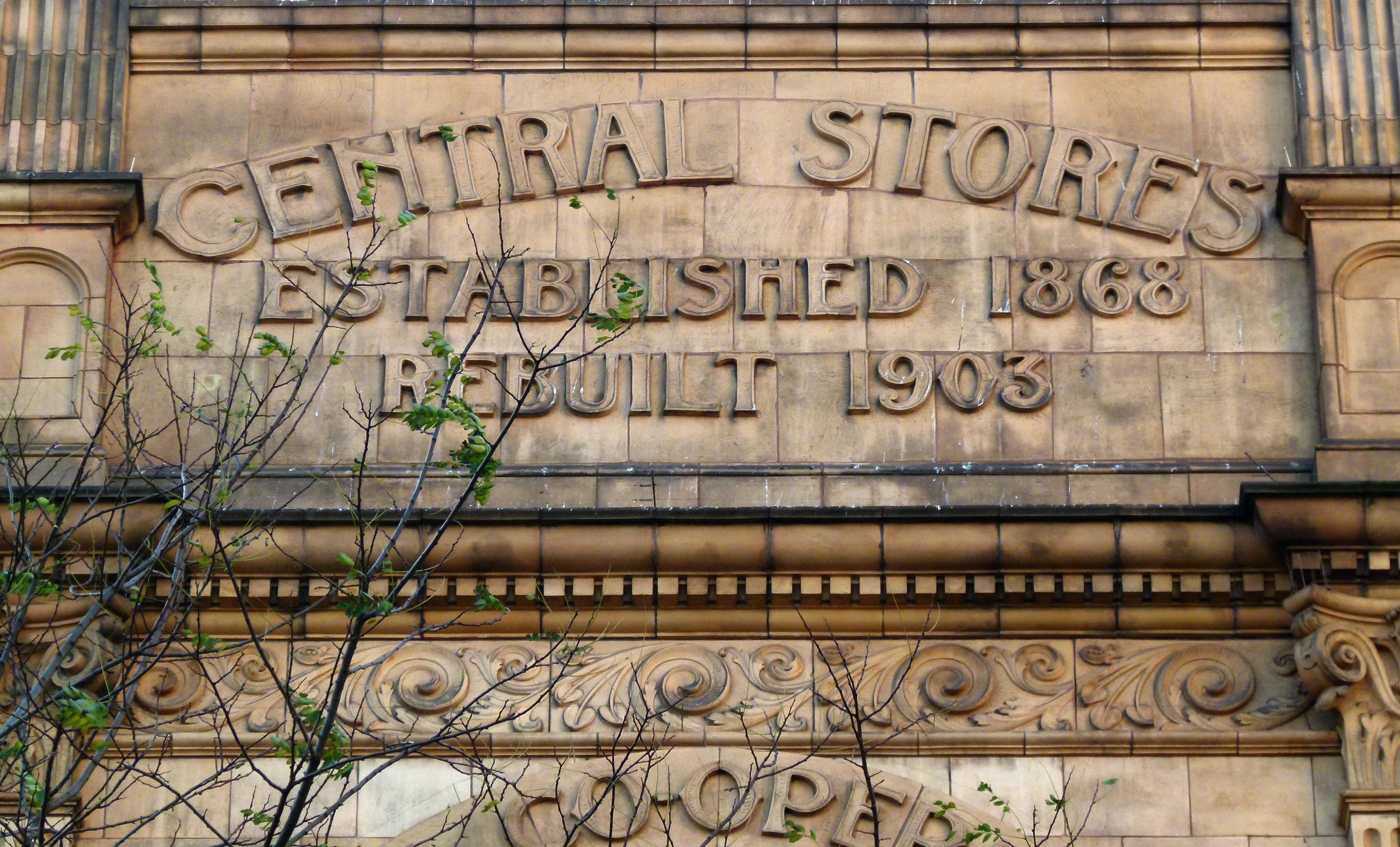
Detail RACS Central Stores, 1903

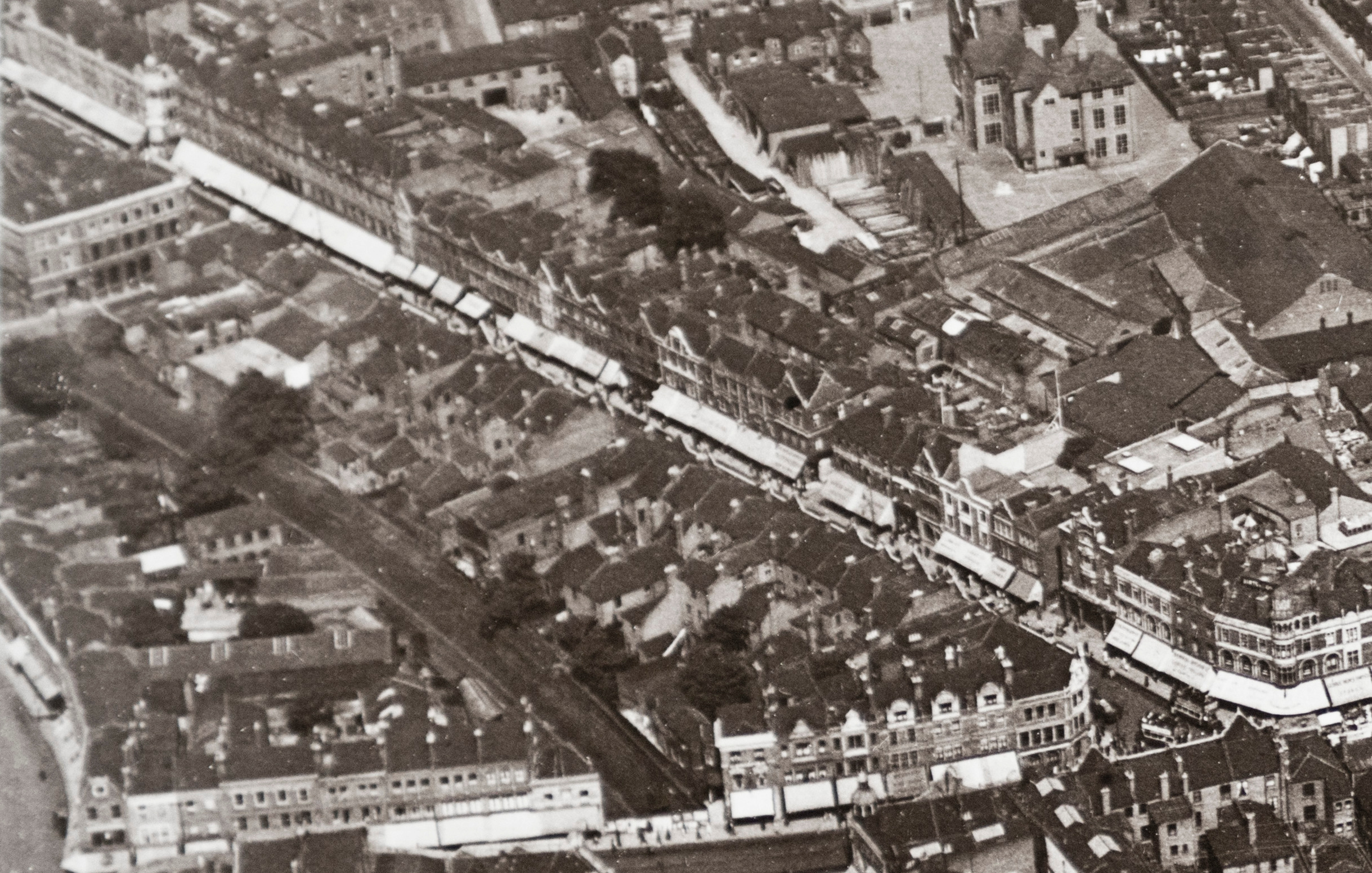
Aerial view, 1921

By 1902, Powis Street had been more or less rebuilt, unified to some extent by the prominent role of H.H. Church. Most buildings were now three or more storeys high with shops on the ground floor and tenants living above. There were still 830 people living in the street in 1901. Some new buildings had offices over the shops. The Woolwich Equitable Building Society had built itself a grand new head office on the corner of Eleanor Road. Further west, the Royal Arsenal Co-operative Society moved into an imposing new building with shops and offices in 1902. Marks & Spencer arrived around 1912 but was relatively small until they rebuilt in the early 1930s and late 1950s. Burton opened its first shop in Powis Street in 1922, followed by two more. Together with Cuffs and Garretts, (Note: Garretts was based in Kent House, on the northeast corner with Macbean Street. The sales rooms occupied three floors with workrooms above for hat and dress makers, and a large dining room and dormitories for employees. It gradually evolved from a draper's to a department store in the 1920s and was promoted as "south east London's quality store" in the 1960s until it closed in 1972. Cuffs, on the other corner of Macbean Street, was its big rival. After modernising in the mid-1950s, it briefly overtook Garrets. It survived a decade longer, until 1983. Saint & Guillery (2012), p. 211-212.) RACS was the biggest retailer throughout the first half of the century. It became even bigger in 1940, when it opened an ultra modern department store across the road from its existing Central Stores. This part of the street had always lagged behind a bit, but became a lot busier after two huge cinemas were built at its western extremity, but not before the road had been widened (1933–34).

The freehold of the Powis estate, since 1812 in the hands of the Ogilby family, passed on to Chesterfield Properties Ltd. in 1964. Many of the leases given out in 1898 had been for sixty years and so another round of redevelopment took place in the late 1950s and early 1960s. Cuffs was in 1956 the first to rebuild in a modernist style. Others followed and more and more ornate Victorian shops were replaced by unadorned modern blocks with cantilevered canopies and glass curtain walls. Some smaller shops were not able to pay the higher rents and were replaced by chain stores. In 1957, Christmas lights were introduced, just three years after Regent Street, two years before Oxford Street. The introduction of parking meters on 11 May 1961 (also the opening day of the notorious Auto Stacker) was among the first in London. Various plans for pedestrianisation and covered walkways from the 1960s never materialised.

The closure of the Royal Ordnance Factory in 1967 and the Siemens factory in 1968 proved to be a turning-point for Woolwich and decline set in. In Powis Street the effects became notable in the 1970s and 80s. Garrets closed in 1972; Cuffs in 1983; the RACS stores in 1985. Their buildings remained empty or were occupied by discount retailers and charity shops. Amidst the decline, the United Kingdom's first branch of McDonald's opened in Powis Street in 1974. Partial pedestrianisation came in the early 1980s, but by then the street had lost its appeal to shoppers who preferred modern shopping malls in Lewisham, Bexleyheath and Bromley. During the 2011 riots, several shops were looted and one was destroyed by arson. With the regeneration of the Royal Arsenal and other parts of the town, the street has seen some improvement in the new millennium, with the arrival of multiples like Starbucks (2008), Nando's (2010), Travelodge (2012), T.K. Maxx (2013) and Dunkin' Donuts (2014). However, Marks & Spencer left Powis Street in 2014 (after more than a century) in order to open an M&S food hall at the Royal Arsenal two years later. Similarly, Starbucks closed in Powis Street around 2019 and reopened in the Arsenal in 2023. The west end of the street is still struggling, although both co-op buildings have successfully been restored and been given a new purpose. The longest established retailer is H. Samuel, jewellers since 1904 at 40 Powis Street. The freehold of most of the shops and apartments was held by Powis Street Estates Ltd. until 2014, then part of the portfolio was sold to Mansford LLP, and sold again to British Land in 2018.

In May 2019 the street became part of a conservation area. The Woolwich Conservation Area comprises the Bathway Quarter, Beresford Square, Greens End, General Gordon Square, parts of Woolwich New Road, Powis Street, Hare Street, Mortgramit Square, parts of Woolwich High Street (south) and St Mary's Church and Gardens. A refurbishment of the public space both in Powis Street and Beresford Square was begun in 2023,

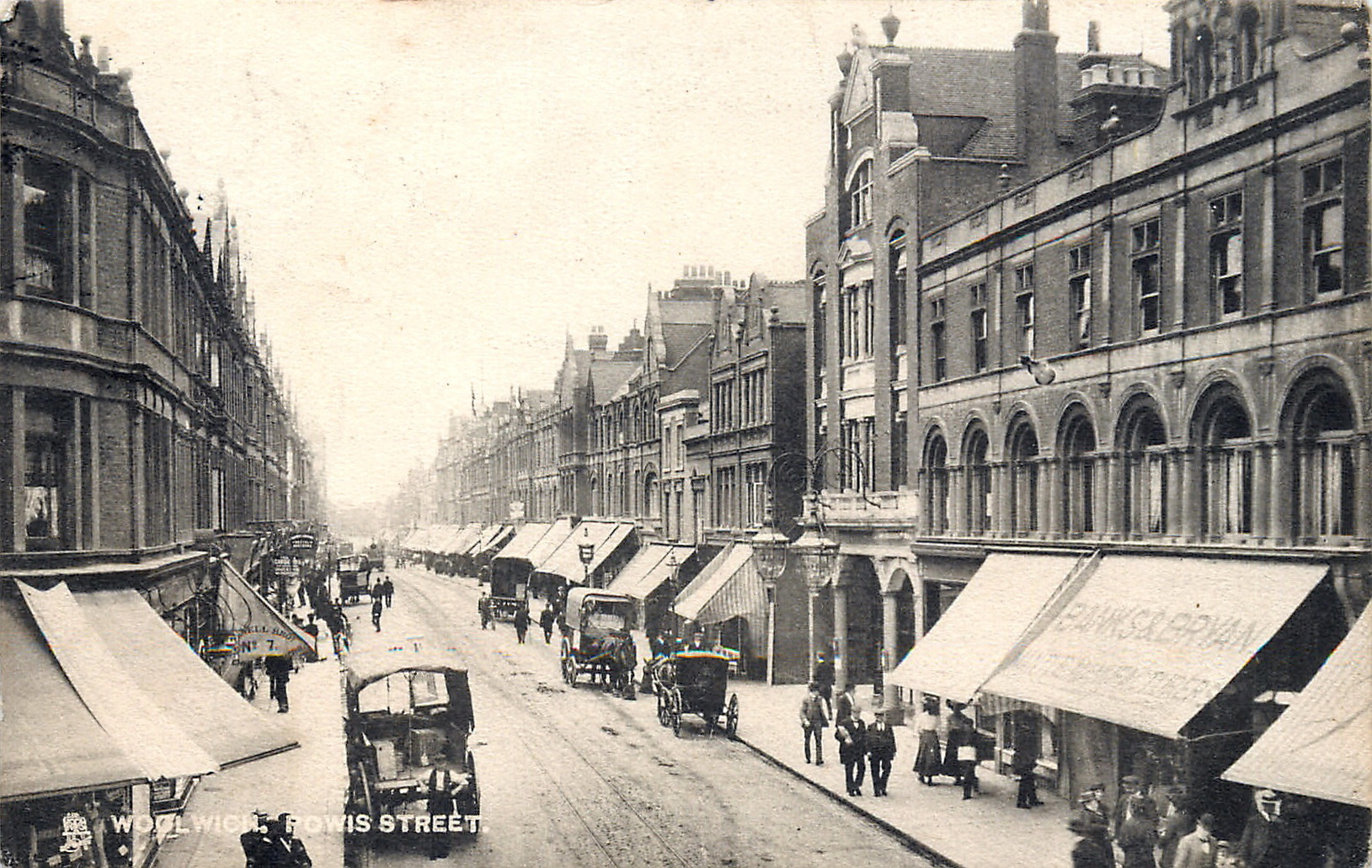
East end, c. 1900. To the right: the Shakespeare

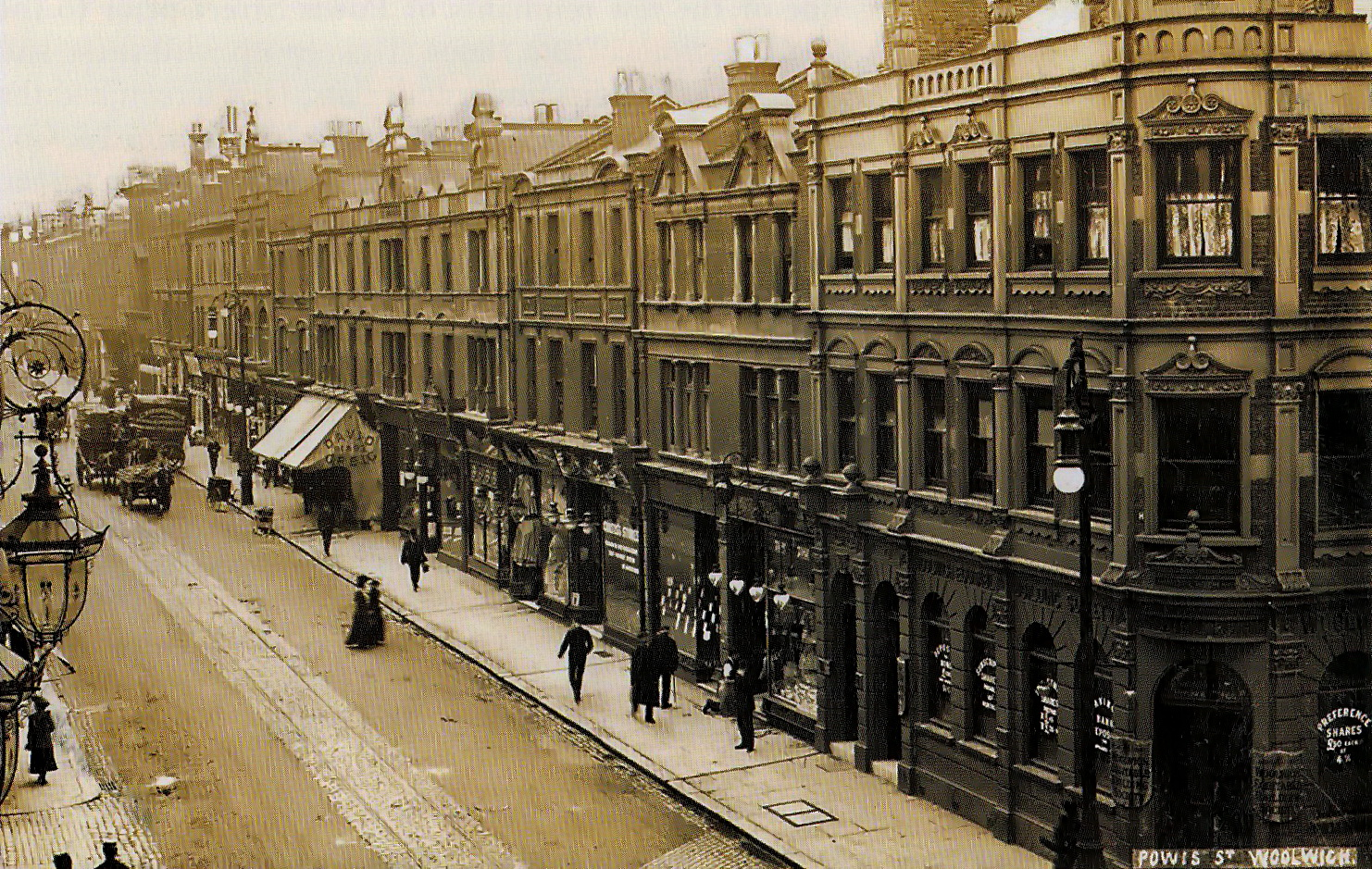
Corner Powis Street/Eleonore Place, c 1905

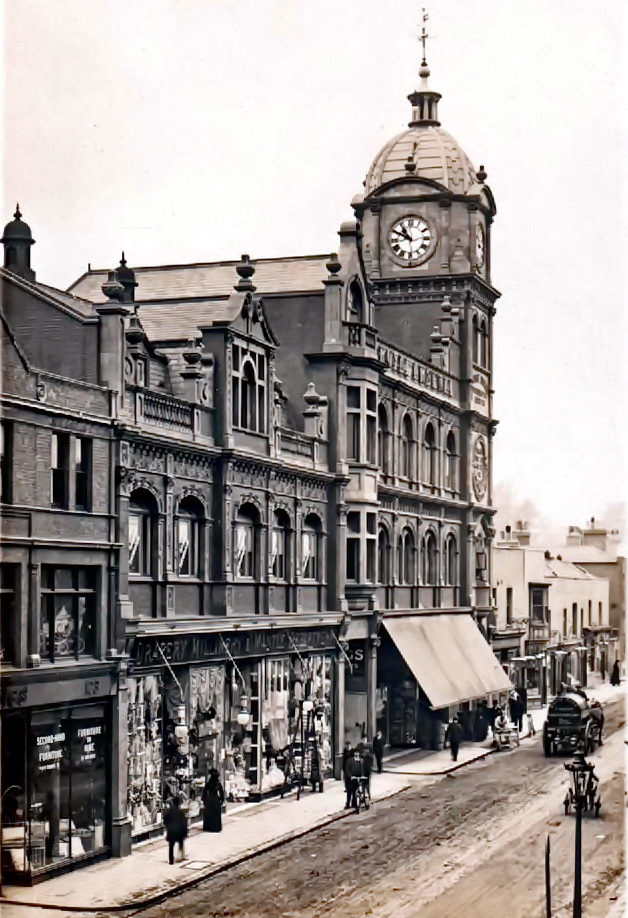
RACS Central Stores, partly built, 1907

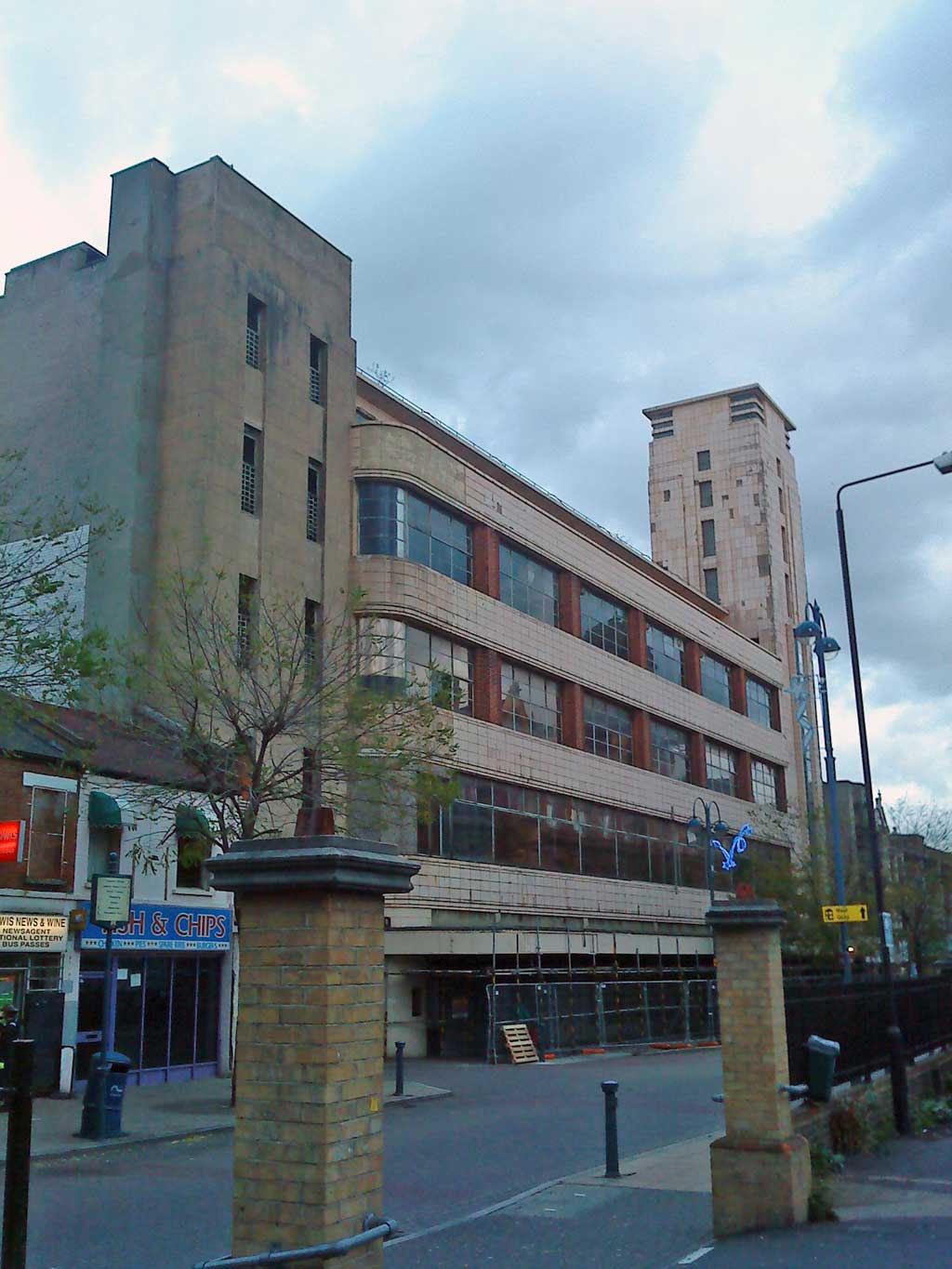
RACS department store, before refurbishment, 2008

== Architecture ==
=== East end - South side ===
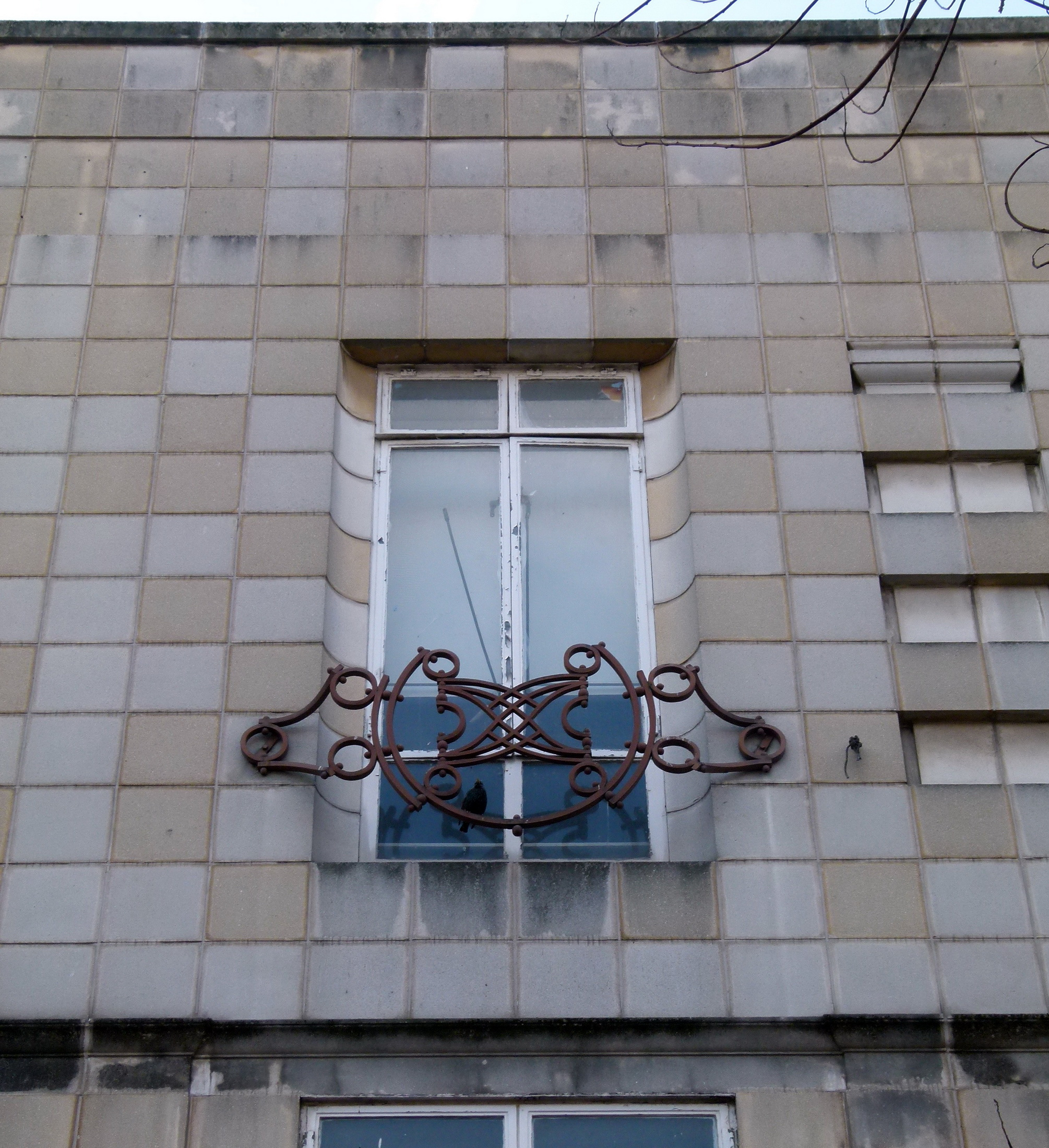
Detail former Marks & Spencer store with tiled façade and Art Nouveau wrought iron balconies

The section between Green's End/Beresford Square and Barnard Close/Hare Street has always been the most dynamic part of the street. It went through various rebuilding campaigns. About half of the shops here have Victorian or Edwardian façades, although storefronts are almost exclusively modern. The corner of Green's End with the south side of Powis Street (nrs 1–7) was redeveloped in 1958–60, after a design by British-American architect Hector Hamilton. It features glass curtain walls with artificial-stone mullions, a pavement canopy and a set-back corner with diamond-patterned ornament. The next two buildings on the south side (nrs 9-21) are of the same proportions and from the same period but were both refronted in the first decade of the 21st century. This is followed by what was originally a uniform row of seven shops by H.H. Church, built in 1899–1900, of which three have survived (nrs 23–27). Further west are a three-bay shop from 1925 (nrs 33–35), some unassuming brick buildings of 1956-58 (nrs 37–45), another brick building of 2013-14 that replaced a shop by H.H. Church destroyed in the 2011 London riots (nrs 47–49), and two shops by local builder W. Harris of 1866-68 (nrs 51–53). The Marks & Spencer building on the corner of Calderwood Street (nrs 55–69) was started in the 1930s and extended in a similar style in the 1960s. Its façade is clad with artificial-stone tiles, which was the company's uniform style at the time.

The building on the opposite corner of Calderwood Street (nrs 71–77) was part of an ambitious plan of 1958 for a shopping mall and an office tower block on the south side of Powis Street, extending over the railway. The original plan was redesigned in 1966, but only partly realised in the early 1970s. To the west of this development are pairs of shops of 1867 (nrs 79–81) and the late 1890s (nrs 83–95). The last pair is the sole survivor of a larger block that was demolished to create the entrance for the intended shopping mall. In 2016 plans were submitted to build apartments above the one-storey shop units on this site (nrs 97-101). Further west are two more pairs of shops from the 1890s (nrs 103–109). The last block (nrs 111–113, on the corner of Barnard Close) was the head office of the Woolwich Equitable Building Society from 1896 until 1935, when they moved to Equitable House in General Gordon Square.

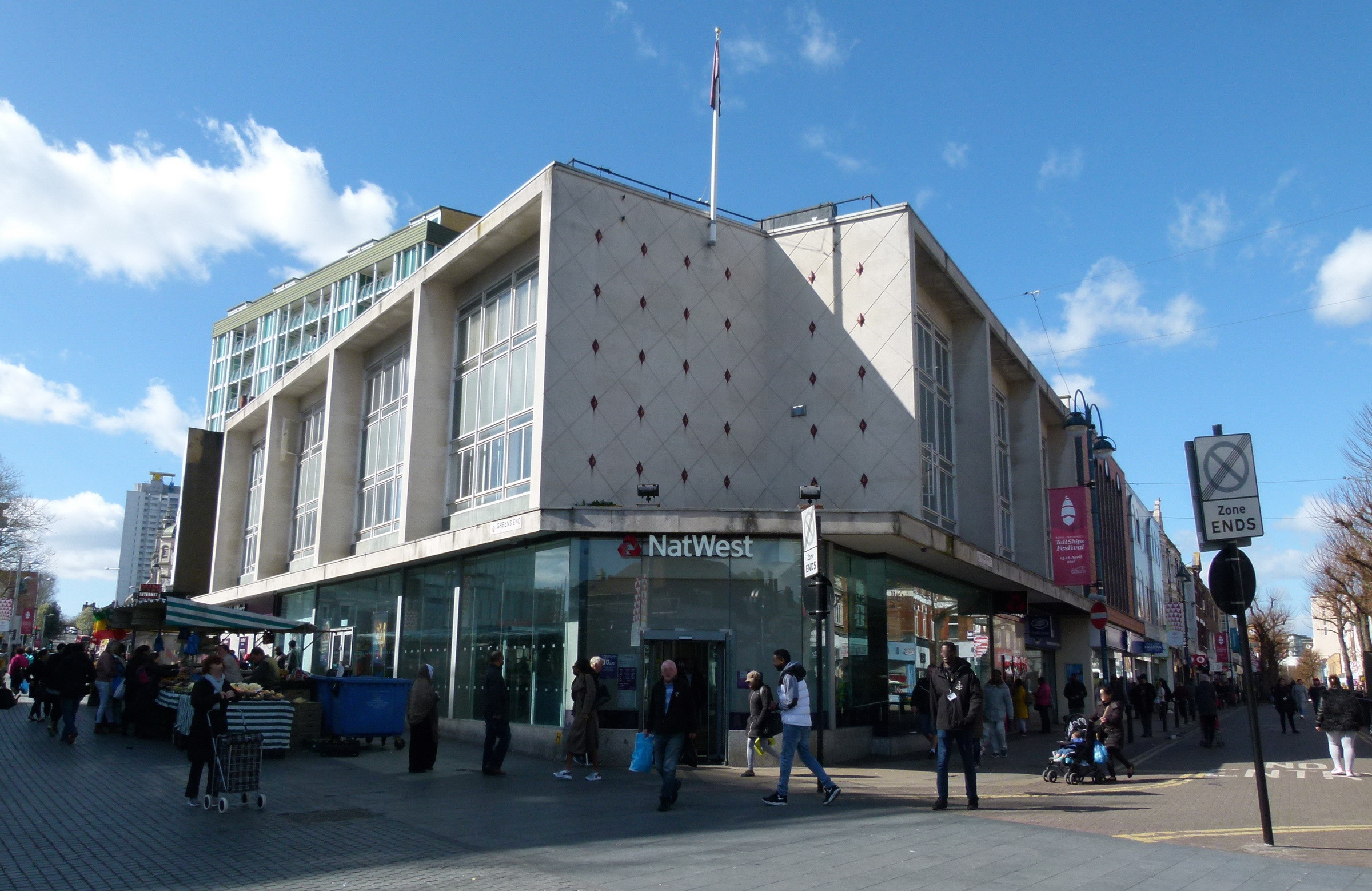
Corner building Powis Street - Green's End

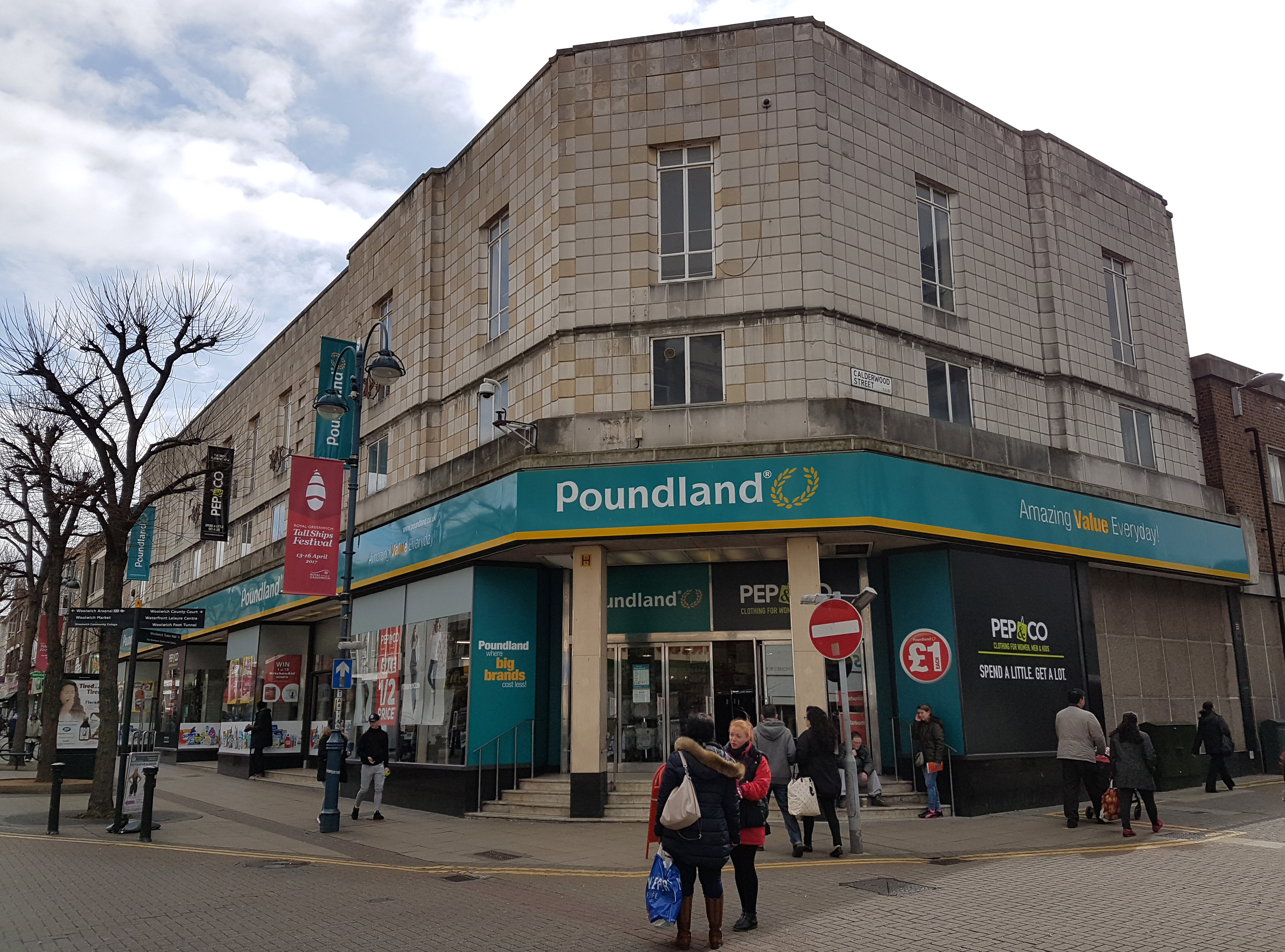
Former Marks & Spencers building

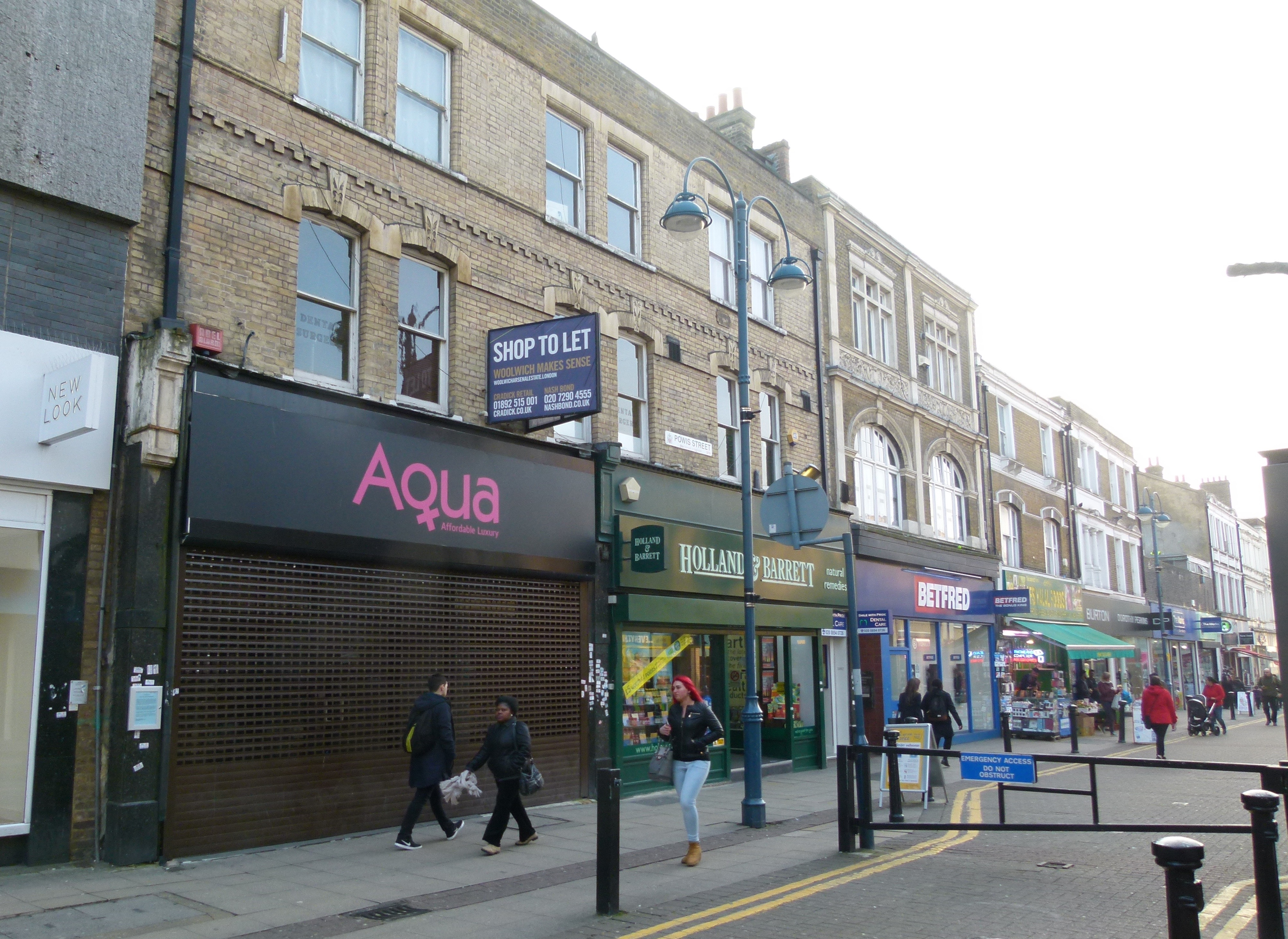
Victorian façades, 79-109 Powis Street

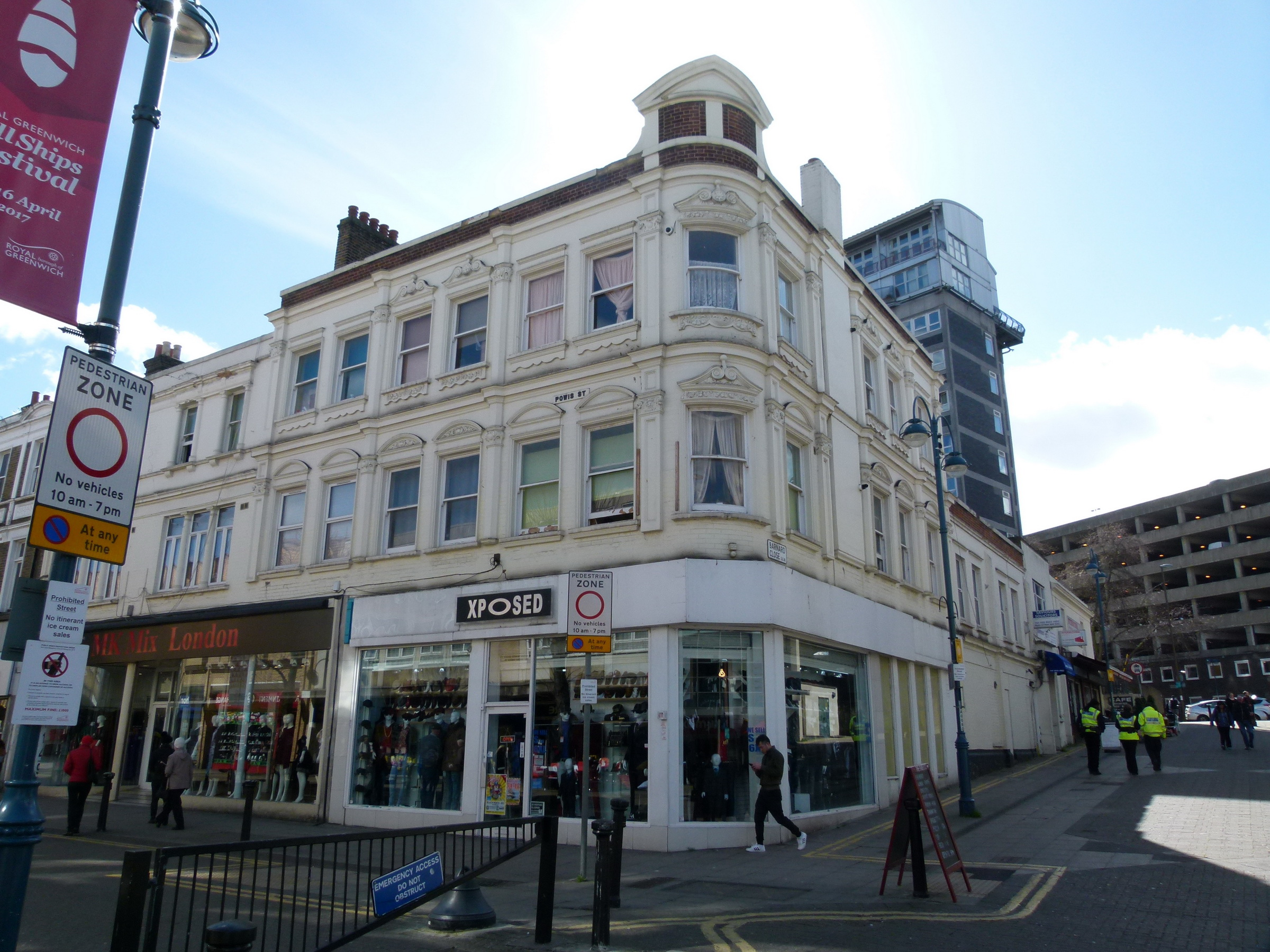
Former Woolwich Equitable head office

=== East end - North side ===
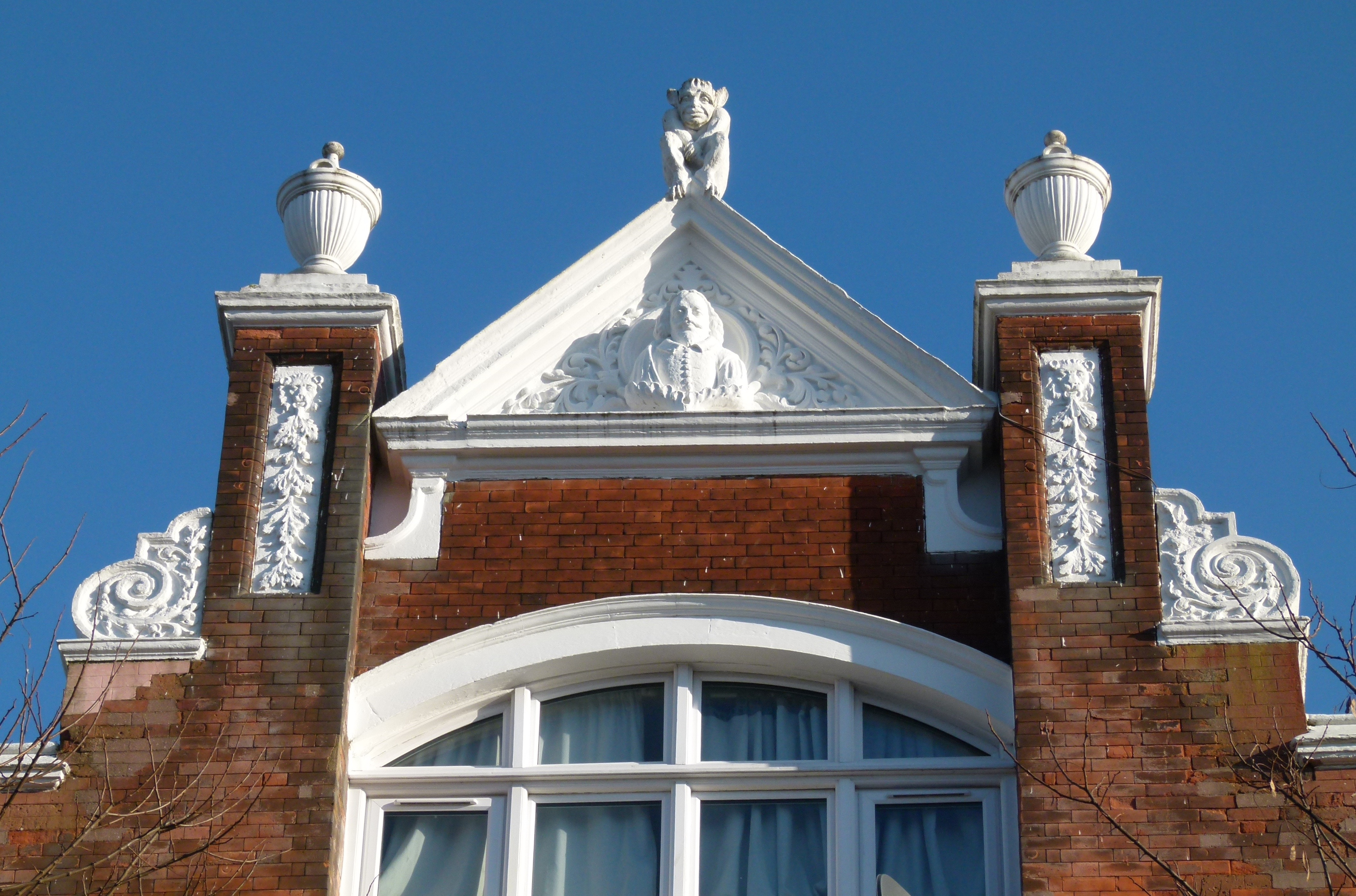
Detail former Shakespeare pub

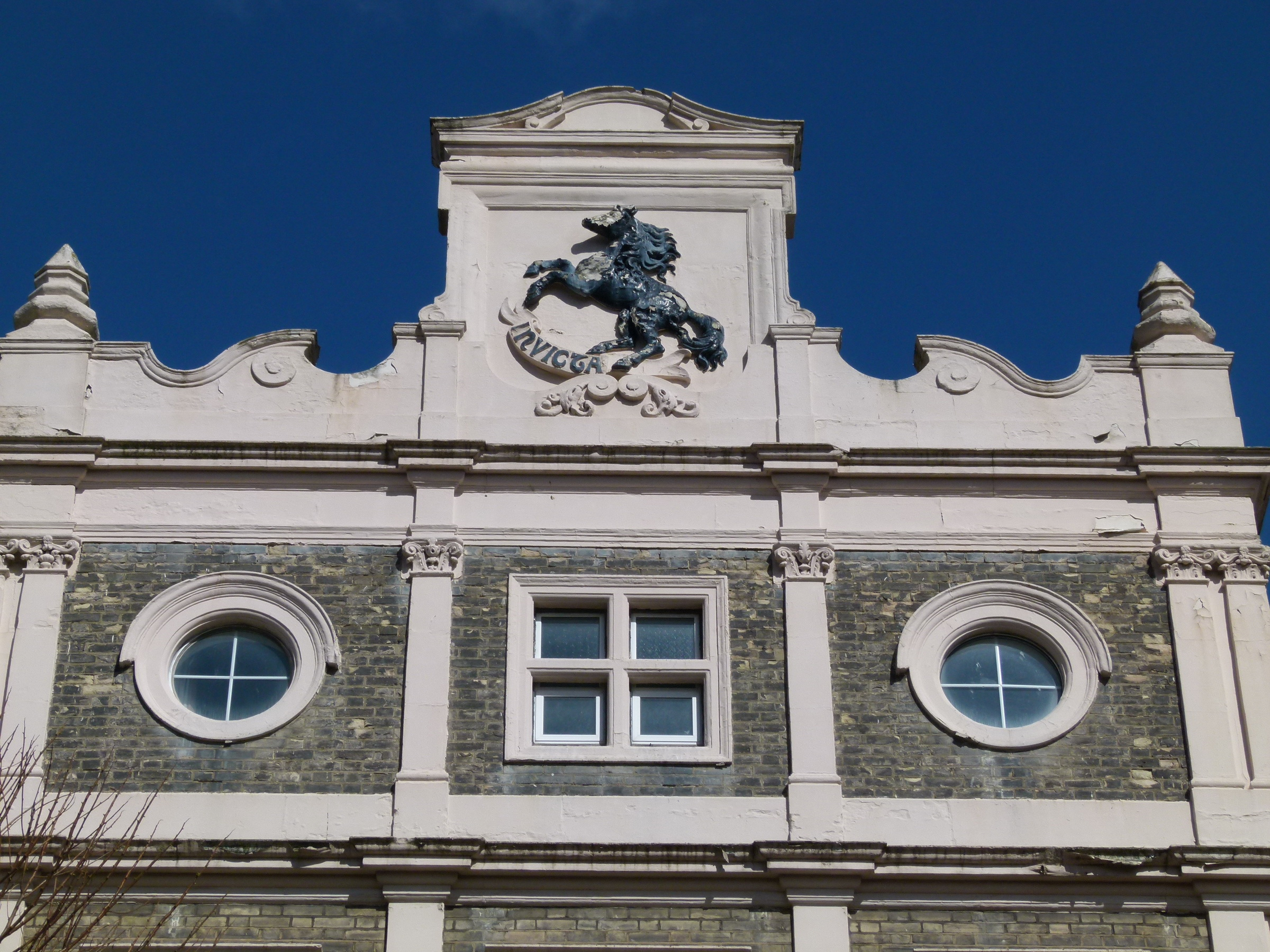
Detail Kent House

The north side of the street has an equally eclectic appearance. On the corner with Beresford Square (nrs 2-10) is a modern development of 1959–60, featuring stone-clad concrete frames and a pavement canopy, similar to the one on the opposite corner. The former Shakespeare public house (nr 12) was established in 1807 and probably took its name from the adjacent theatre. It was rebuilt by H.H. Church in 1890-91 and survived little altered. It is topped by a pediment with a bust of Shakespeare and an imp atop. The site of the former theatre (nrs 14–16) is now occupied by a building from 1958 to 1960. Next door are twin shops (nrs 18–20) built in a revivalist style reminiscent of Church in 1923. The two rows of red-brick shops that follow (nrs 22-28 and 32–42) were built by Church in 1894–99. They are separated by a narrow street, Murray's Yard. The corners feature pointed and stepped Flemish gables (the stepped gable is repeated on the Murray Yard side). The row originally continued further west, but some of it (nrs 44–48) was replaced by Woolwich Borough Council's Electric House in 1935–36. This is a classically proportioned building which has kept its cream-coloured faience façade and bronze window frames on the upper storeys, as well as some of the interior decorations. Adjacent are two almost identical modernist buildings of 1959-60 (nrs 50–60) and three smaller shops (nrs 62–66).

More or less half-way in Powis Street, the two great rivals Garretts and Cuffs occupied imposing buildings on either side of Macbean Street. On the north east corner is Kent House (nrs 68–86), named after an earlier development on this site. It was rebuilt by Garretts in the 1890s. The architect was, again, H.H. Church, who this time used yellow brick and a more classical style. Although nowadays divided into smaller shop units, with unharmonious storefronts, Kent House is still considered Church's best surviving work in Powis Street. On the other corner of Macbean Street stood Cuffs (nrs 88-104), moderner but equally grand. After its closure in 1983, it was demolished and replaced by a fortress-like block occupied by a supermarket and some smaller shops. Its neighbour further west (nrs 106–112), built in 1959–61, has the same proportions but has a more lively façade through the use of Ancaster stone panels set against a Portland stone background, as well as having apartments above the shops.

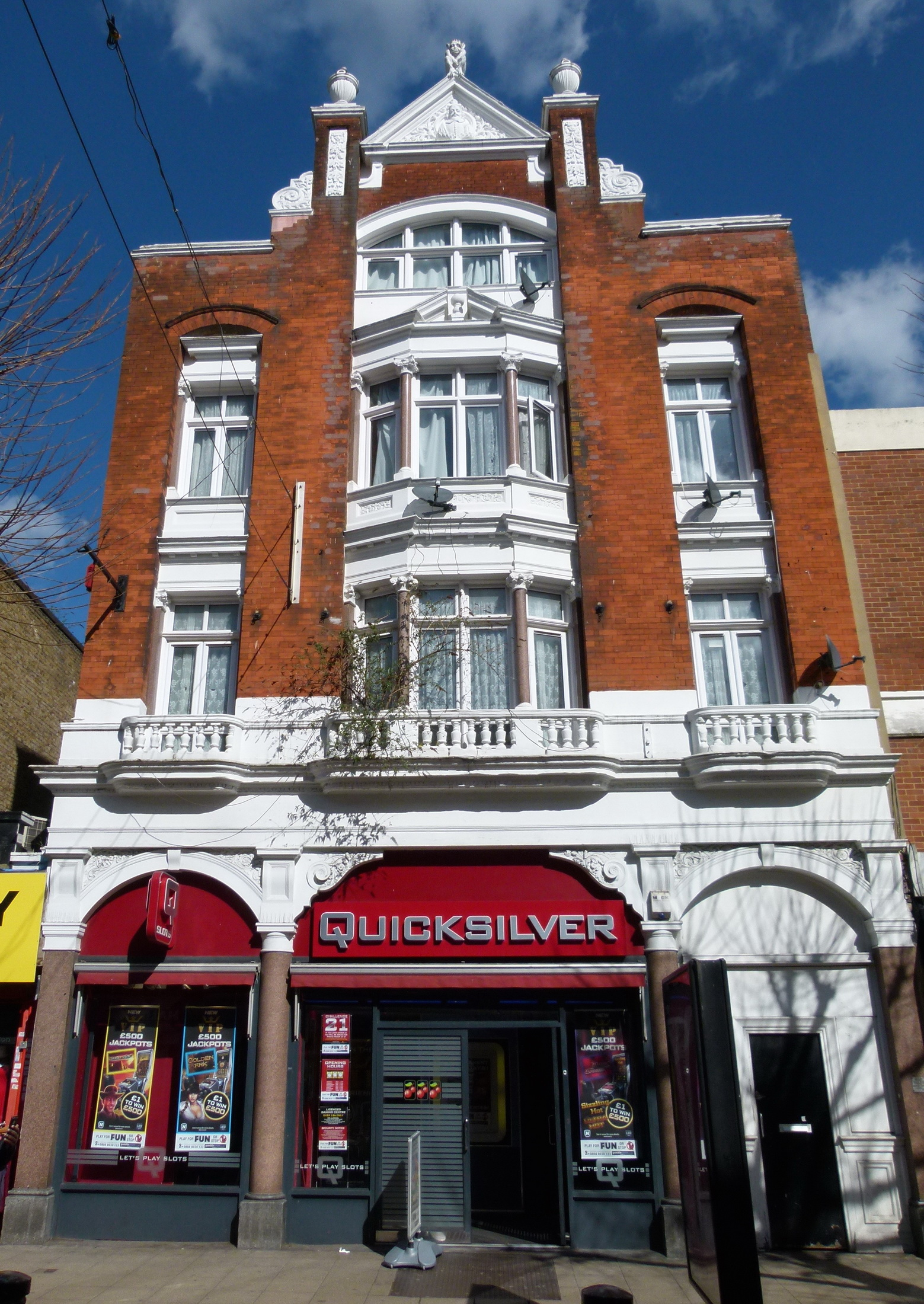
Former Shakespeare pub

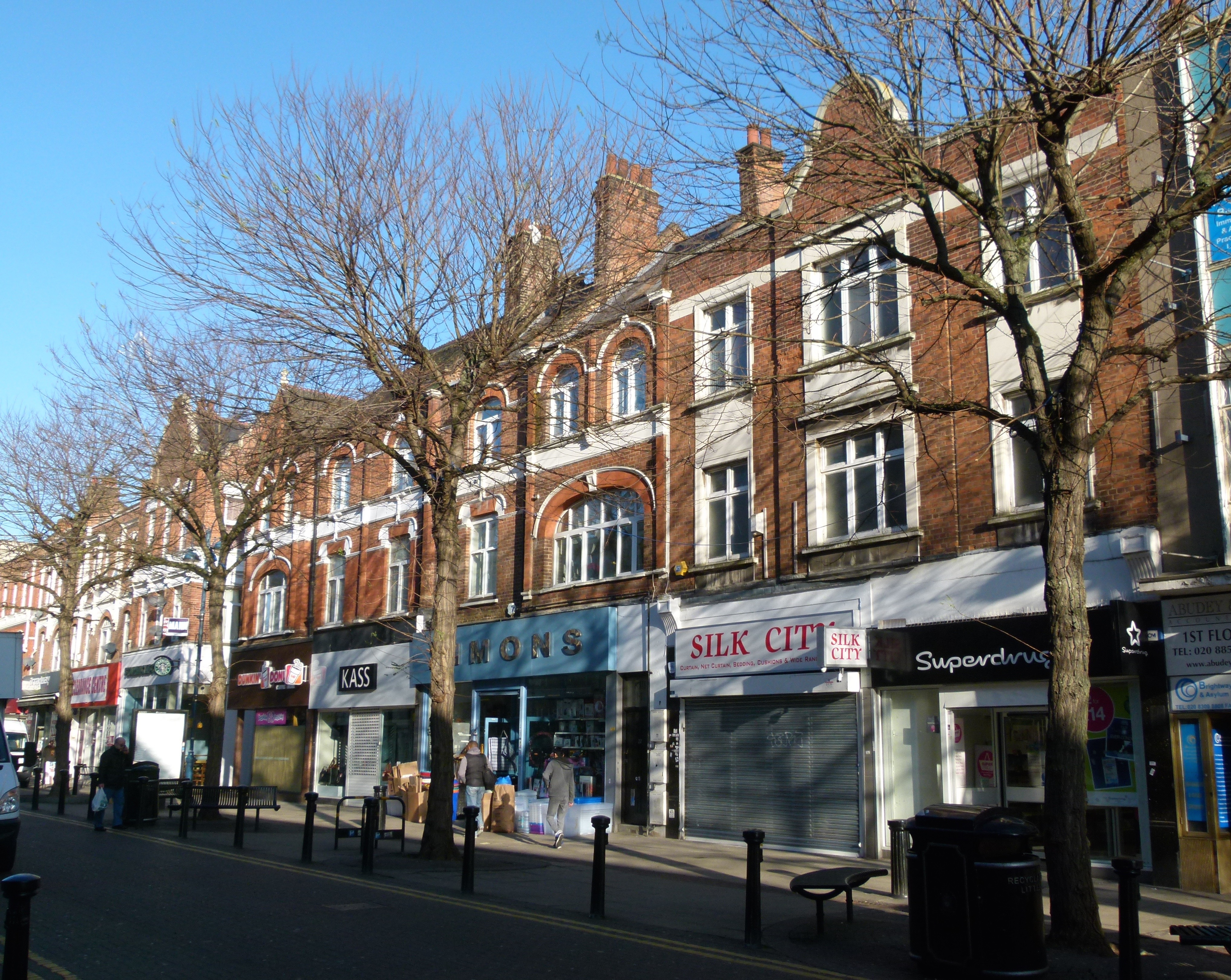
Late-Victorian façades

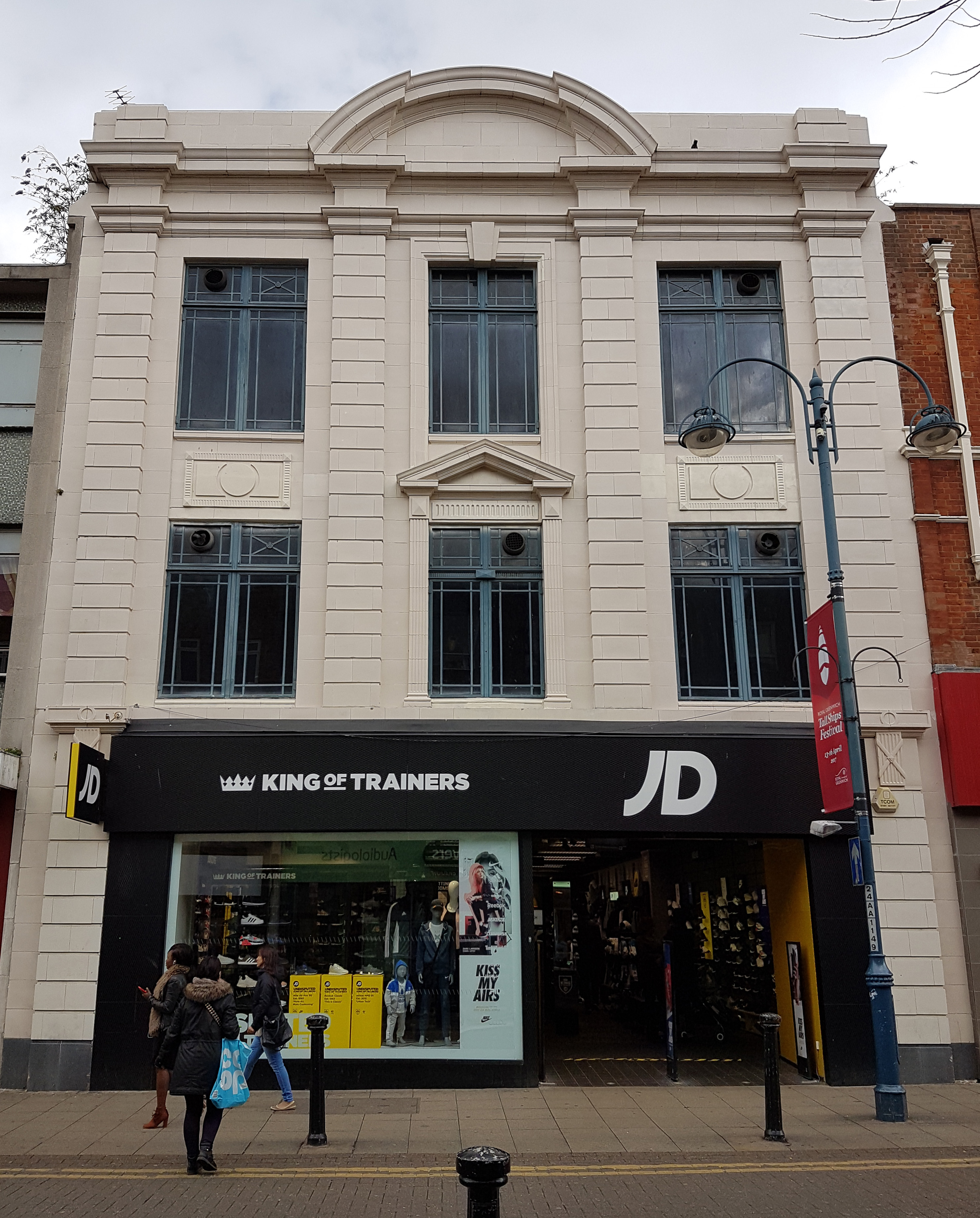
Former Electric House

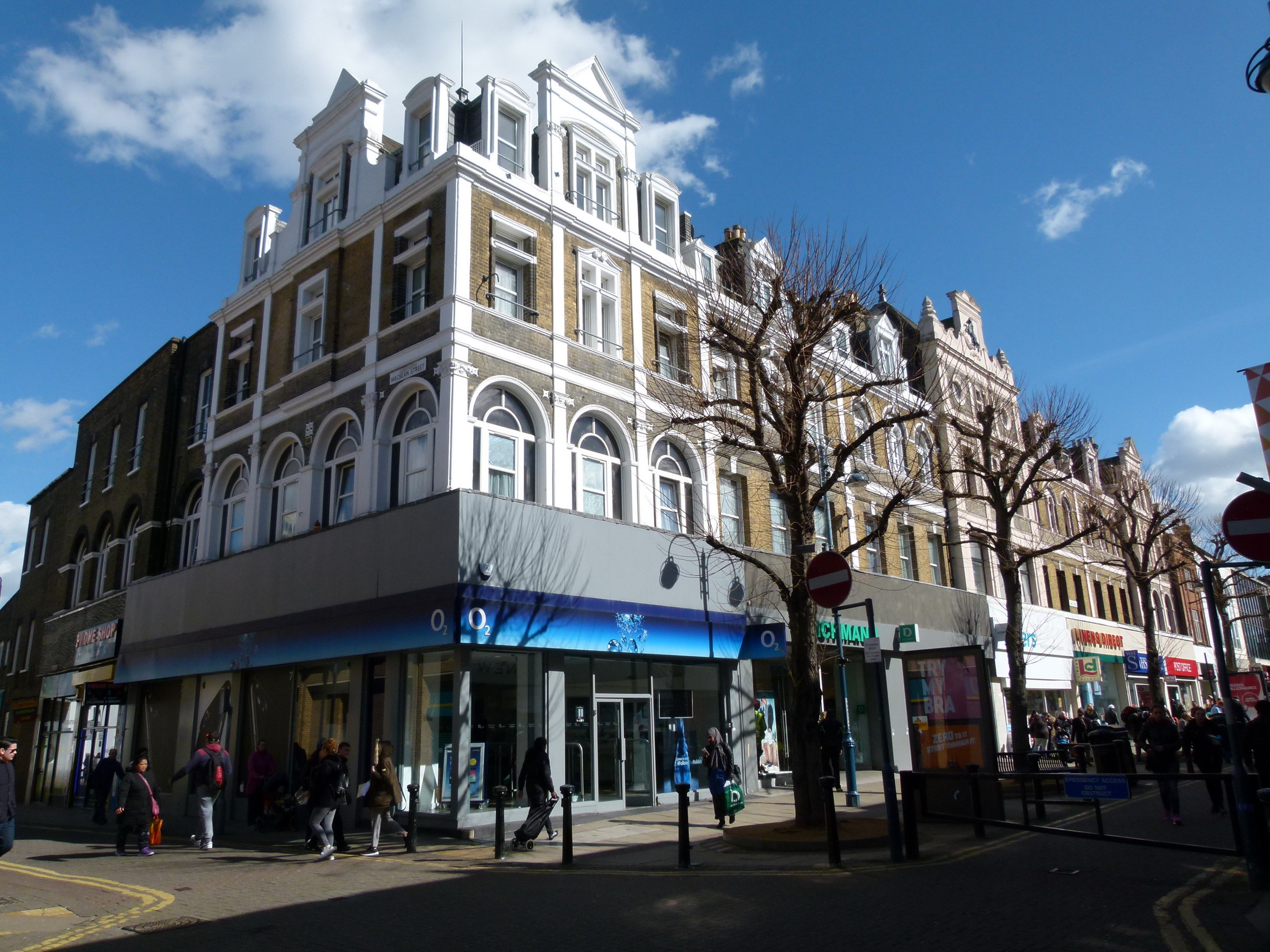
Kent House

=== West end - South side ===
The west end of Powis Street is not pedestrianised although vehicle access is restricted here. Big buildings dominate this part of the street. On the south west corner with Barnard Close (nrs 115–123, opposite Hare Street) five late-Victorian shops were replaced by a building designed by Rodney Gordon (of Owen Luder Partnership) in 1964–65. Its style has been characterized as "blowsy forcefulness".

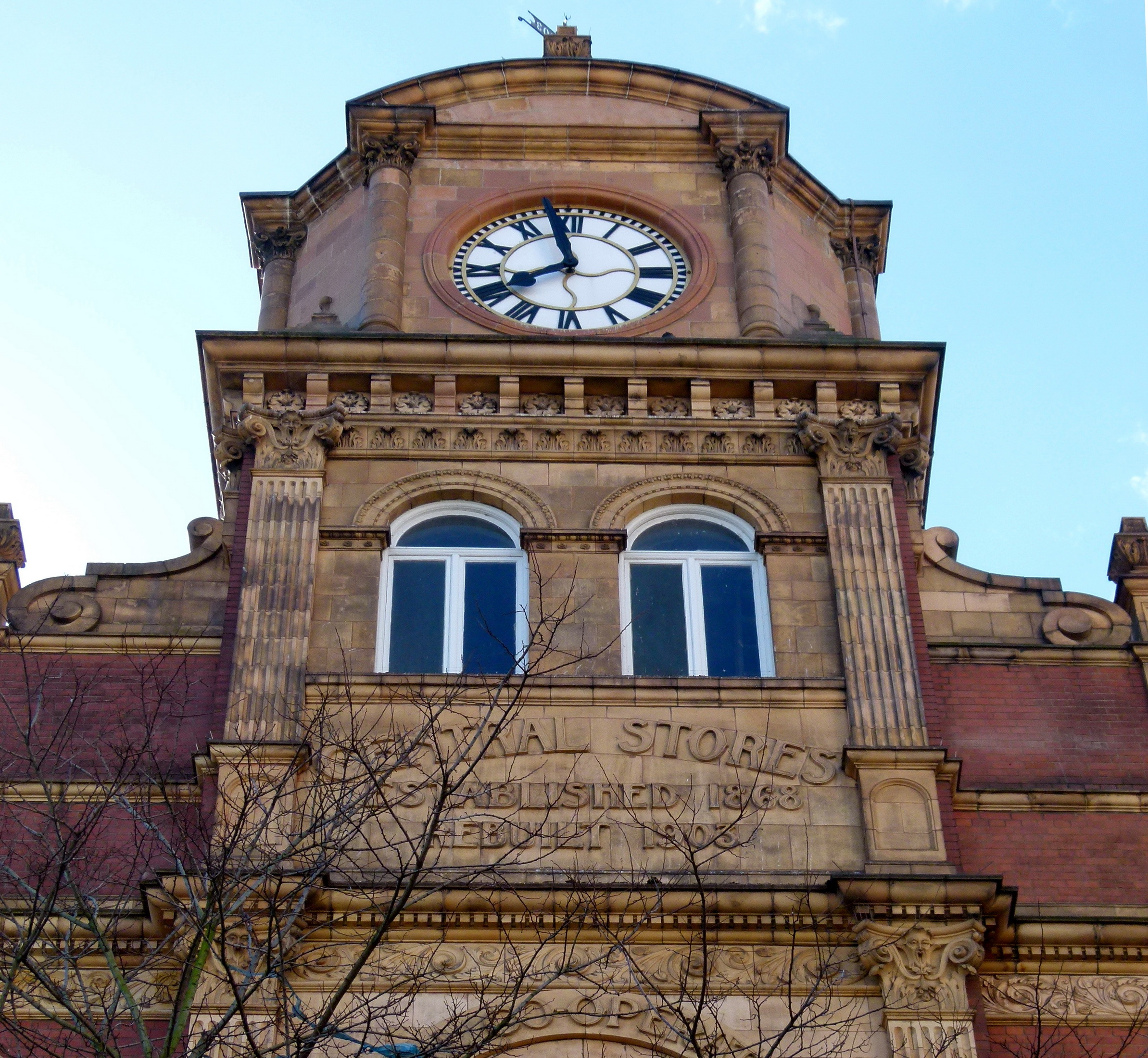
Clock tower RACS buildings

Its neighbour is the late- or rather Neo-Victorian Royal Arsenal Co-operative Society Central Stores (nrs 125–153). With its 82 m long façade it is the largest building in the street. It was designed by the Society's architect, Frank Bethell, and built in three phases, replacing a number of existing RACS shops and adjacent buildings. The easternmost part, including the central tower, was built in 1902–03. The second range was finished in 1912 and the last section in 1926. Above its main entrance is a large statue by Alfred Drury of the RACS' founder, Alexander McLeod (1832–1902). Its 32 m high copper-domed clock tower made it look grander than any other shop in Woolwich. With its red brick and moulded terracotta façade, the architectural critic Ian Nairn thought it would look more at home in the Midlands. After RACS lost its independence in 1985, the Central Stores closed and were used by Greenwich Council. In 1989 the building was listed. In 2011-13 it was converted into a hotel with 120 rooms and shop units.

A vacant lot with a large car park separates the hotel from Woolwich County Court, built by the Office of Works in 1935–36, shortly after the road was widened here. It is a simple red brick building with a Portland stone entrance and the royal arms above. Further west is a short row of Neo-Georgian shops built in 1937-38 after the road-widening. The corner of Parson's Hill, originally the name of this whole area, is occupied by the Castle Tavern (nrs 179), a famous Woolwich hostelry in the 19th century, rebuilt in 1937.

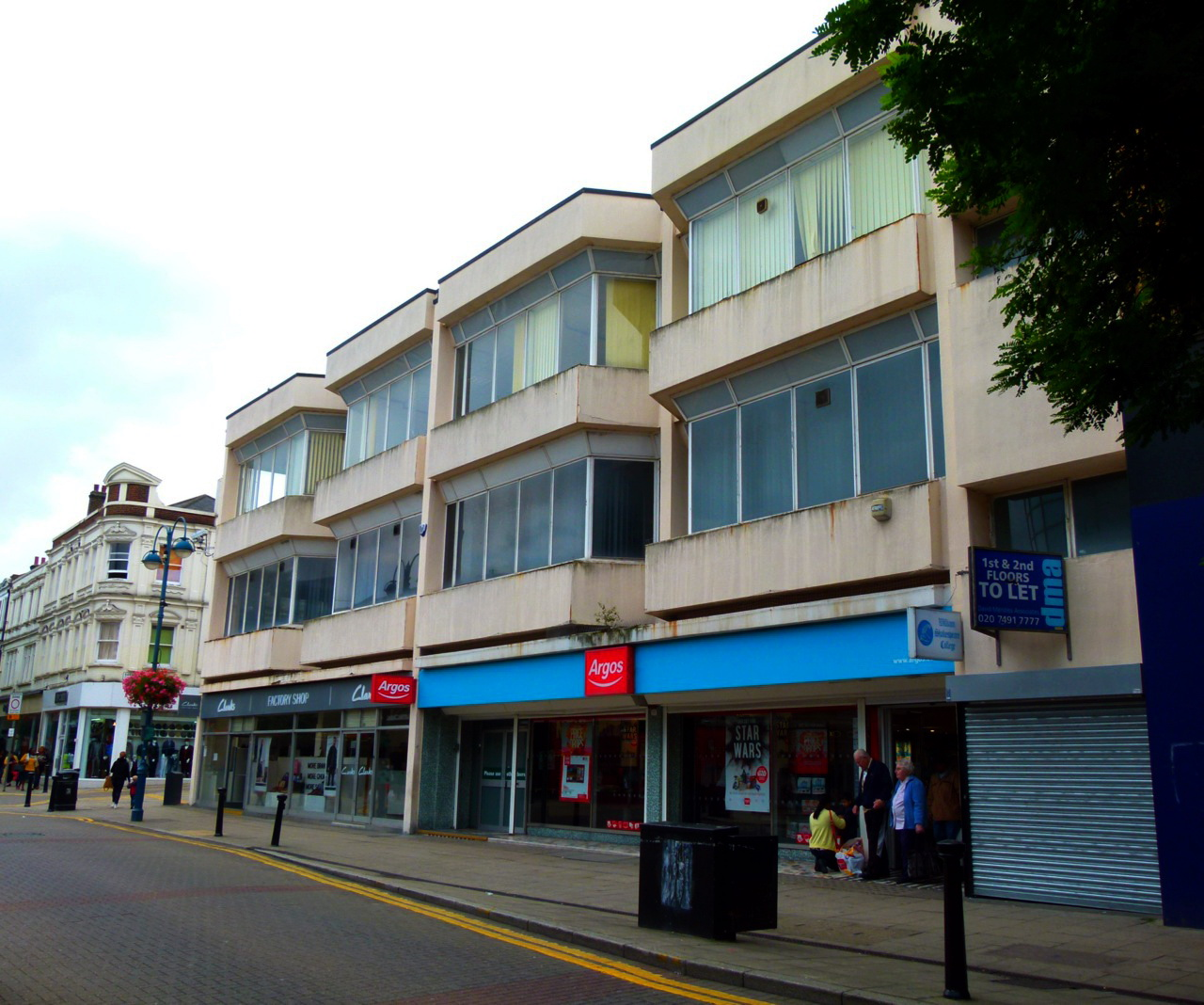
115-123 Powis Street

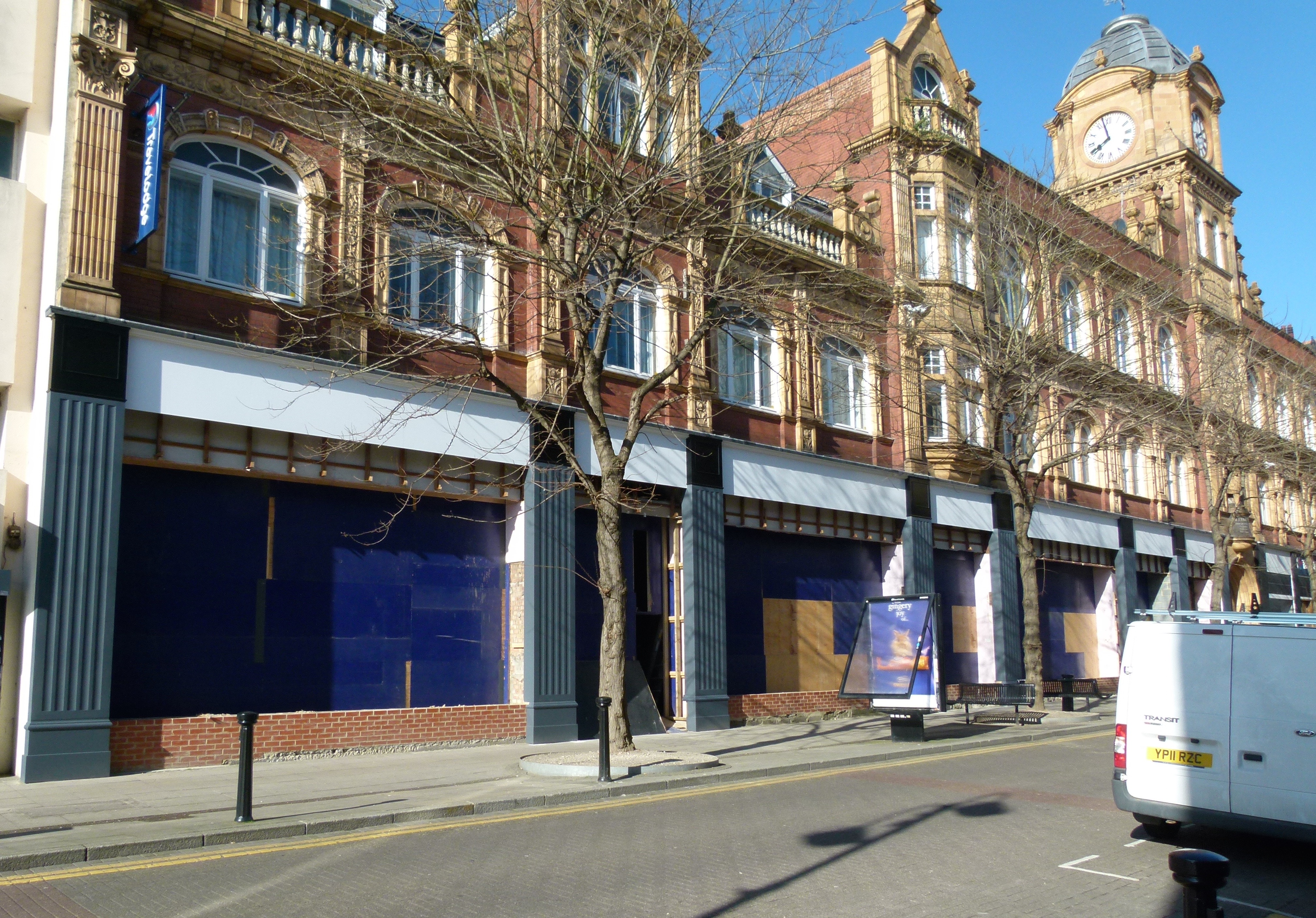
East section RACS Central Stores

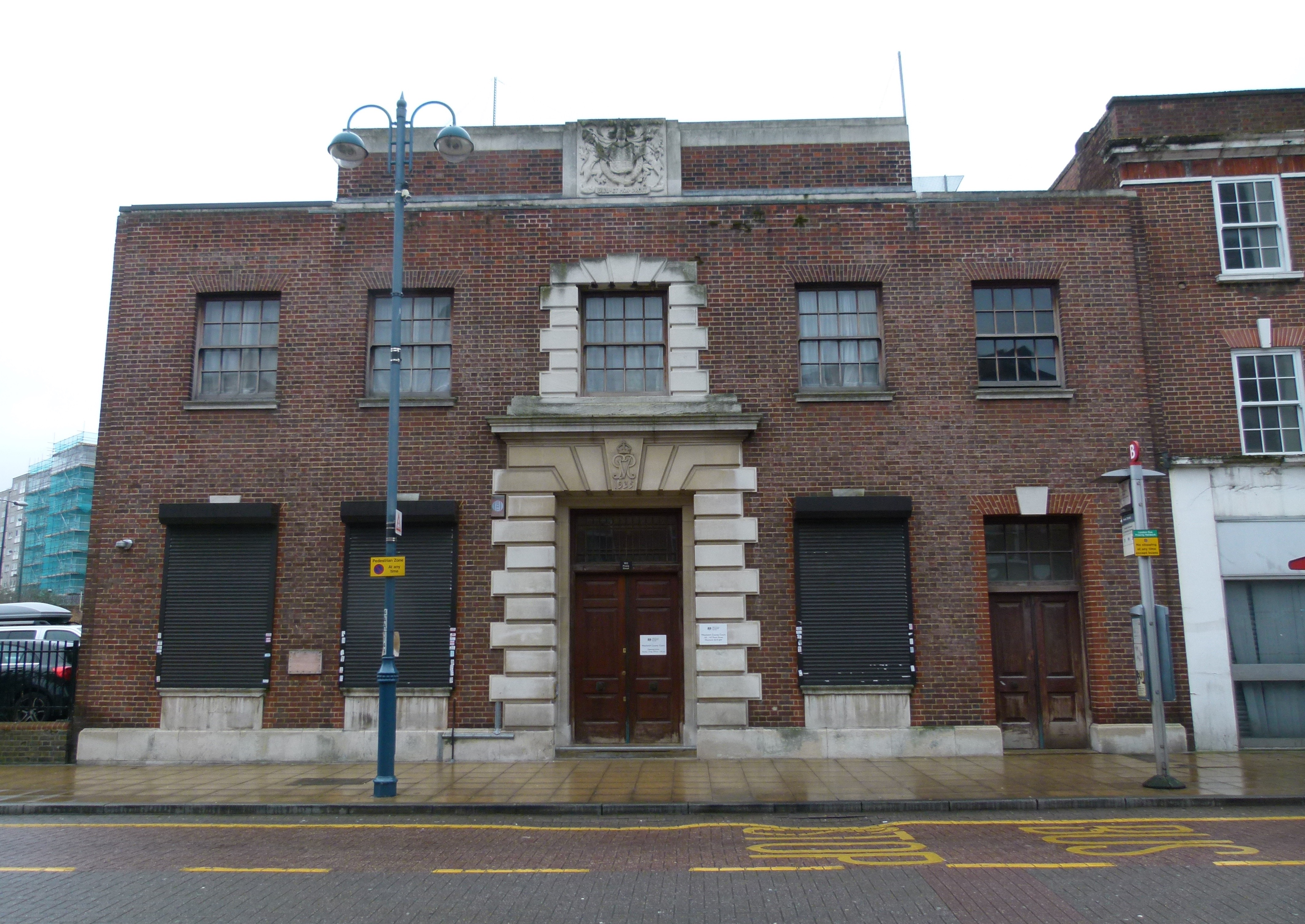
Woolwich County Court

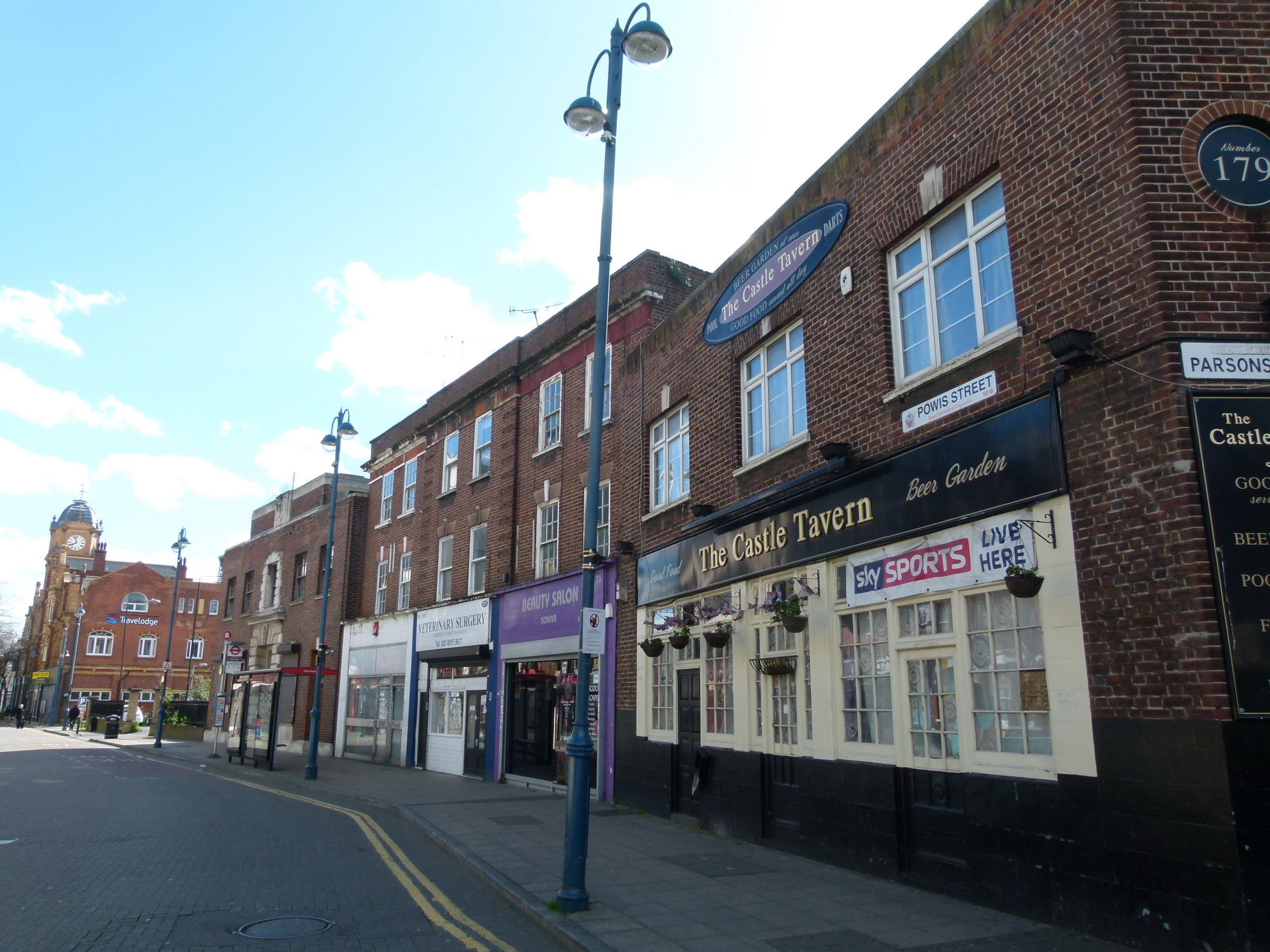
Castle Tavern and adjacent 1930s shops

=== West end - North side ===
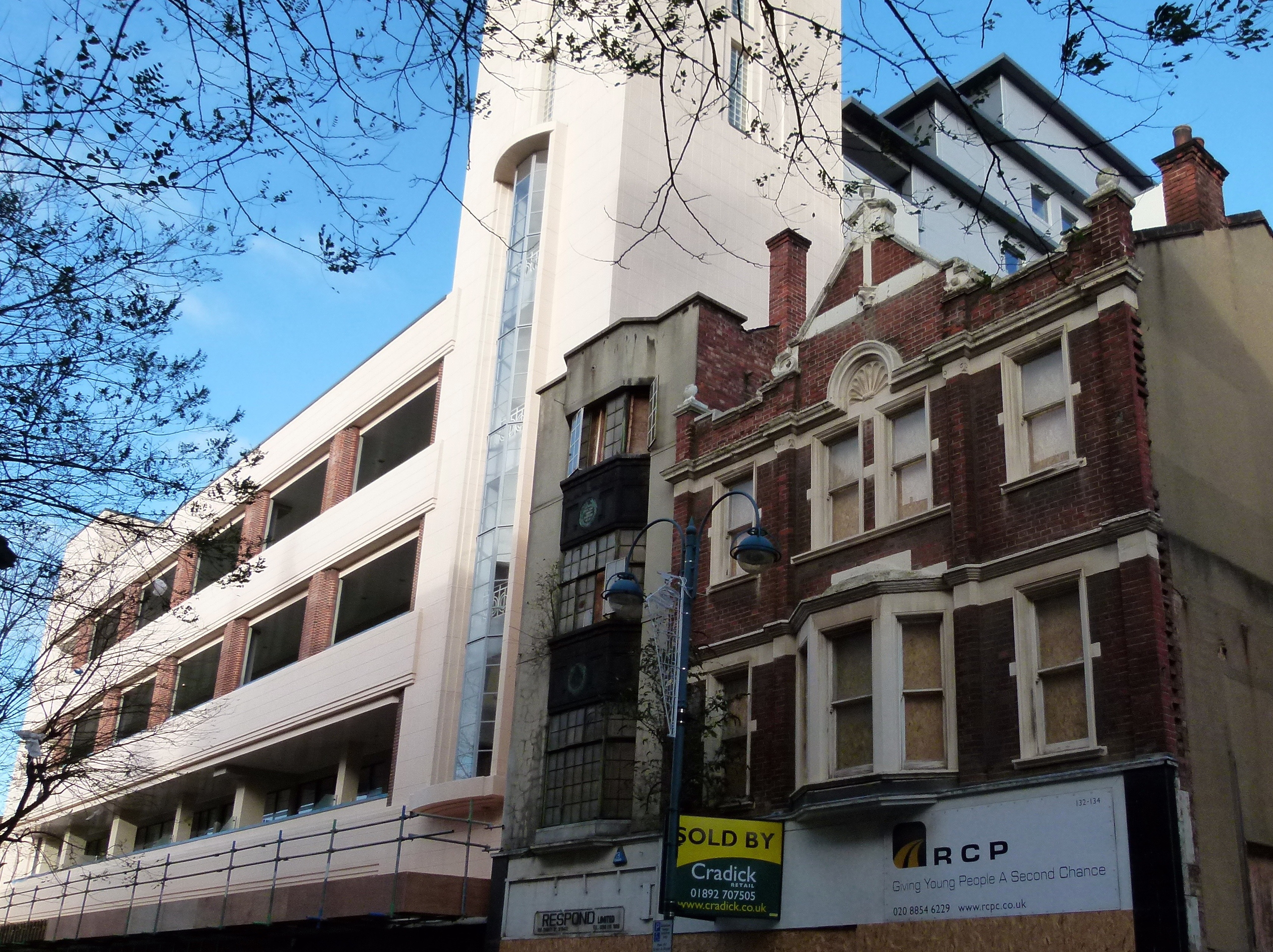
RACS department store and future pub

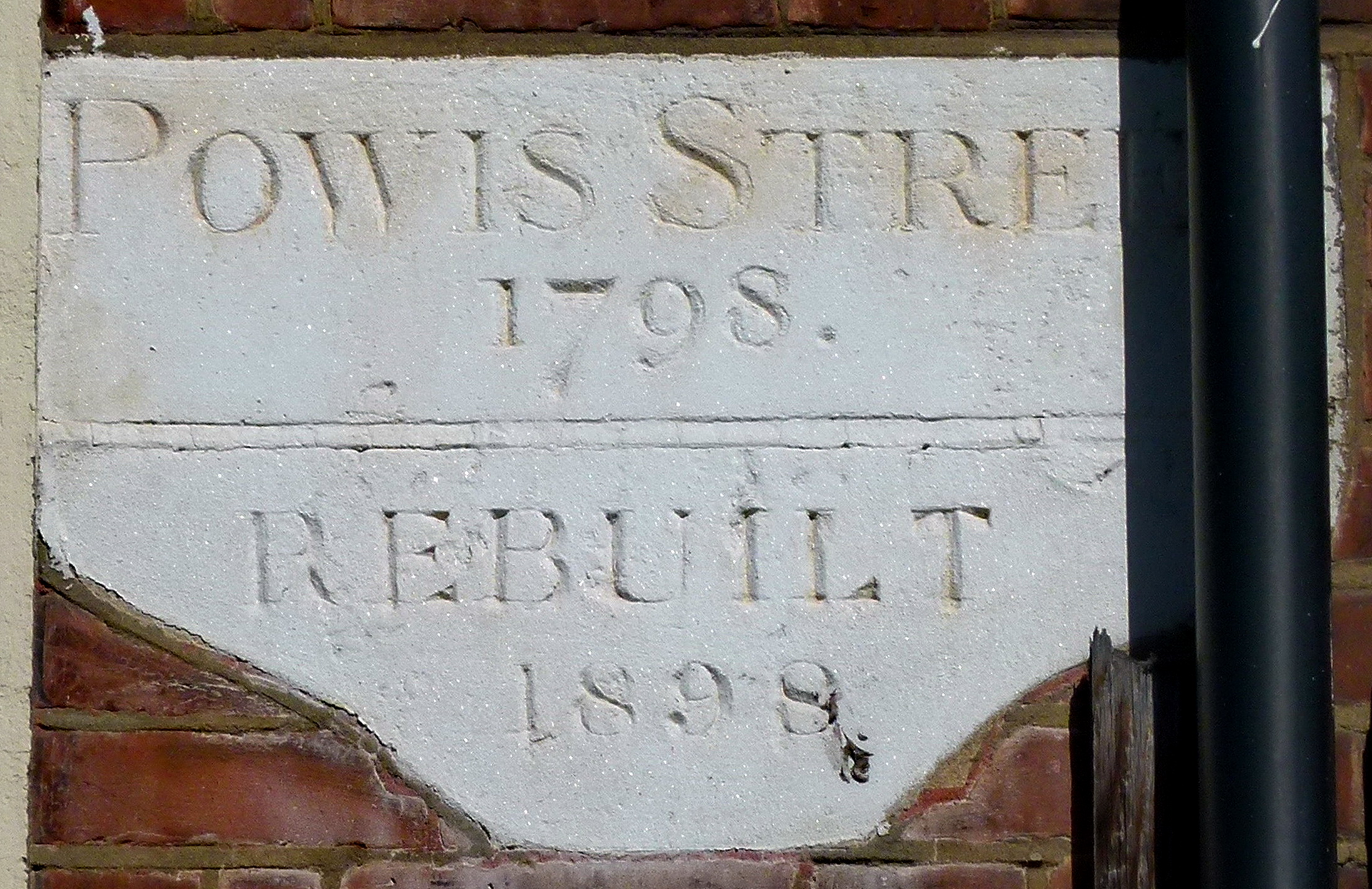
Datestone Powis Street nos 170-172

The large TK Maxx store (nrs 120–130) with its mirrored-glass façade is a new development on the site of the Premier Electric Theatre, which was hit by a bomb in 1940. This development on the corner of Hare Street was a spear point in the 2012 Woolwich Town Centre Masterplan. The two smaller buildings further west (nrs 132–136) were once part of the RACS emporium. One was built in red brick by H.H. Church in 1901 and was used as a chemist's and optician's. The other one, a slender four-storey structure with bay windows, was built in 1930-31 as the Society's funeral furnishers. Planning permission was granted in 2016 to convert both buildings into a pub.

The RACS department store (nrs 138–152) was built in 1938–40 in a streamlined Art Deco style. The store had an open arcade with glass display islands at ground floor and a stylish restaurant on the third floor. The large, metal-framed windows emphasise the horizontal lines in the faience-tiled gable, set between two end towers. The elegant east tower contains an open stairwell with wrought-iron railings with the letters 'co op' integrated in the design. The west tower is less pronounced and stands over an access road to Mortgramit Square. Early plans for the so-called Triangle between Powis Street and Hare Street comprised demolition of the locally listed building. In 2013-16 it was converted into apartments ("The Emporium"), adding three recessed storeys on top of the restored building.

Next to the Mortgramit Square entrance is a row of eight two-storey shops, partly in a dilapidated state. Halfway is a tiled building that used to be the showroom of Furlongs Garage. The gate still provides access to the garage and petrol station on Woolwich High Street. The row ends with a former doctor's house and surgery (nrs 170–172; originally nr 1). This house of 1898-99 has a double datestone, one from 1798, a relic from the early beginnings of the street.

The last building on this side of Powis Street is the former Granada Cinema, Woolwich, now a church of Pentecostalism. The imposing brown-brick building has a curved façade and a slender advertising tower (Cecil Massey & Reginald Uren, 1936–37). It was built in a modified modern architecture style, mindful of the Dutch architect Willem Marinus Dudok. Its magnificent Gothic and eclectic interior, originally seating 3,000, was designed by Theodore Komisarjevsky.

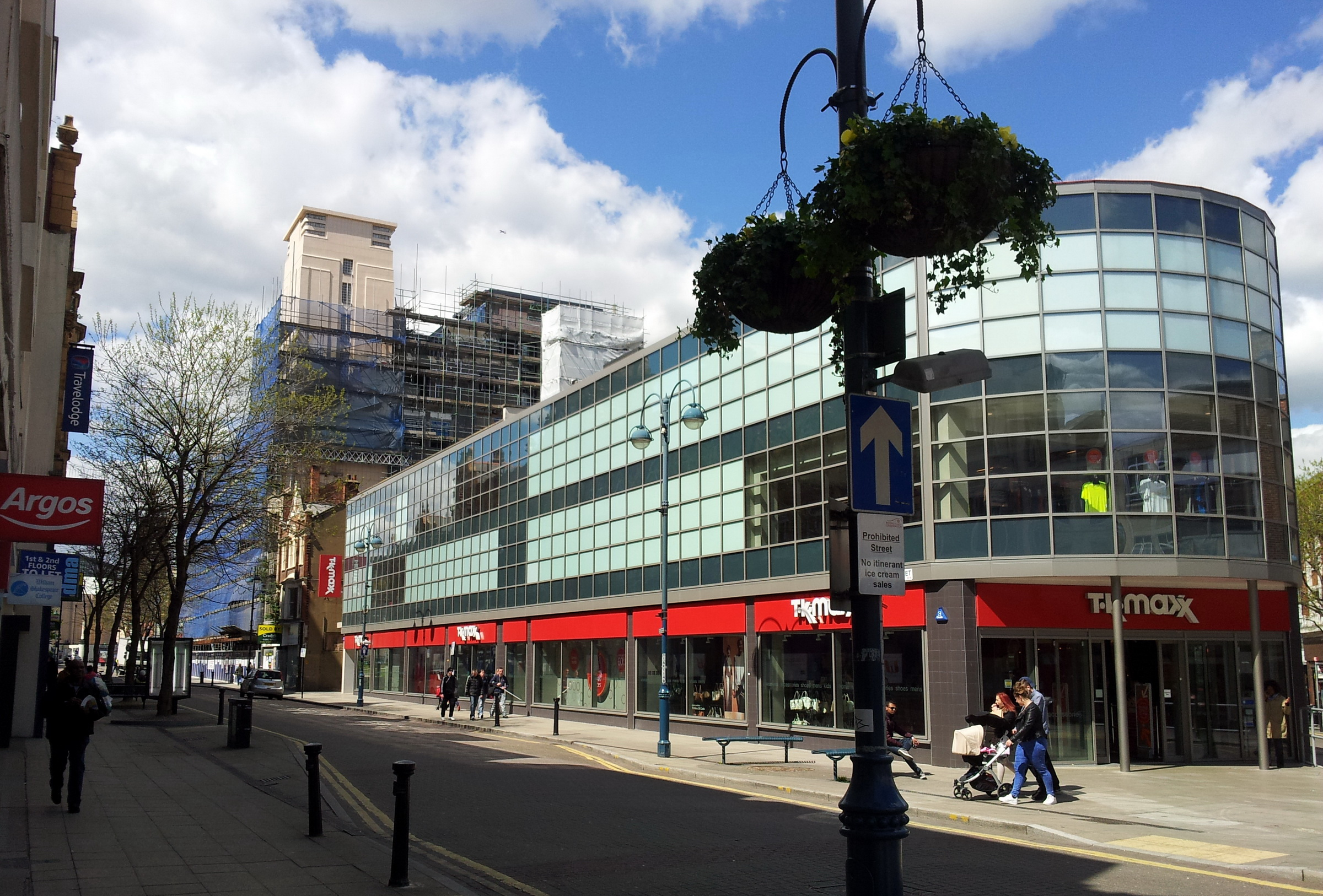
120-130 Powis Street (TK Maxx)

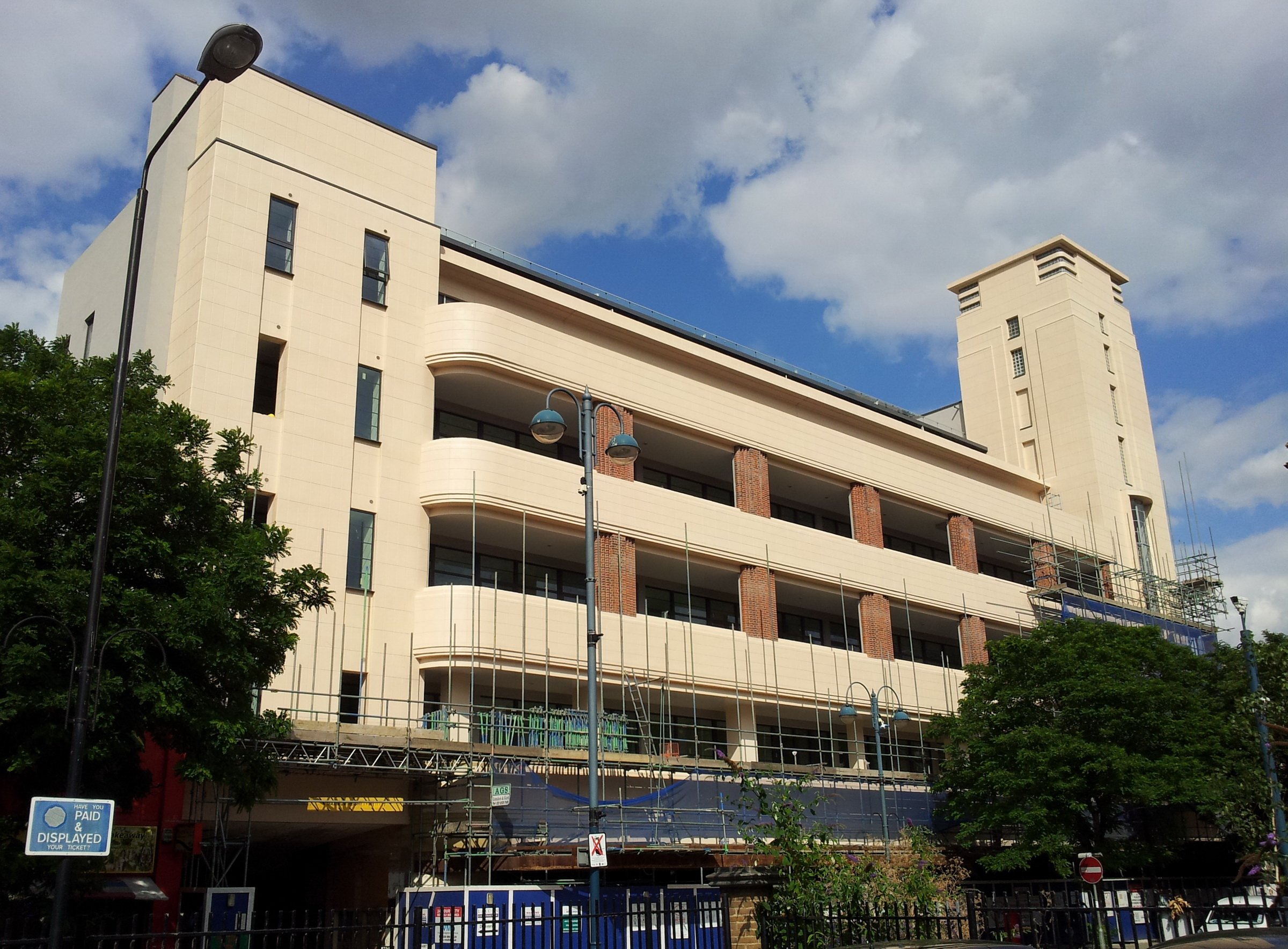
Former RACS department store

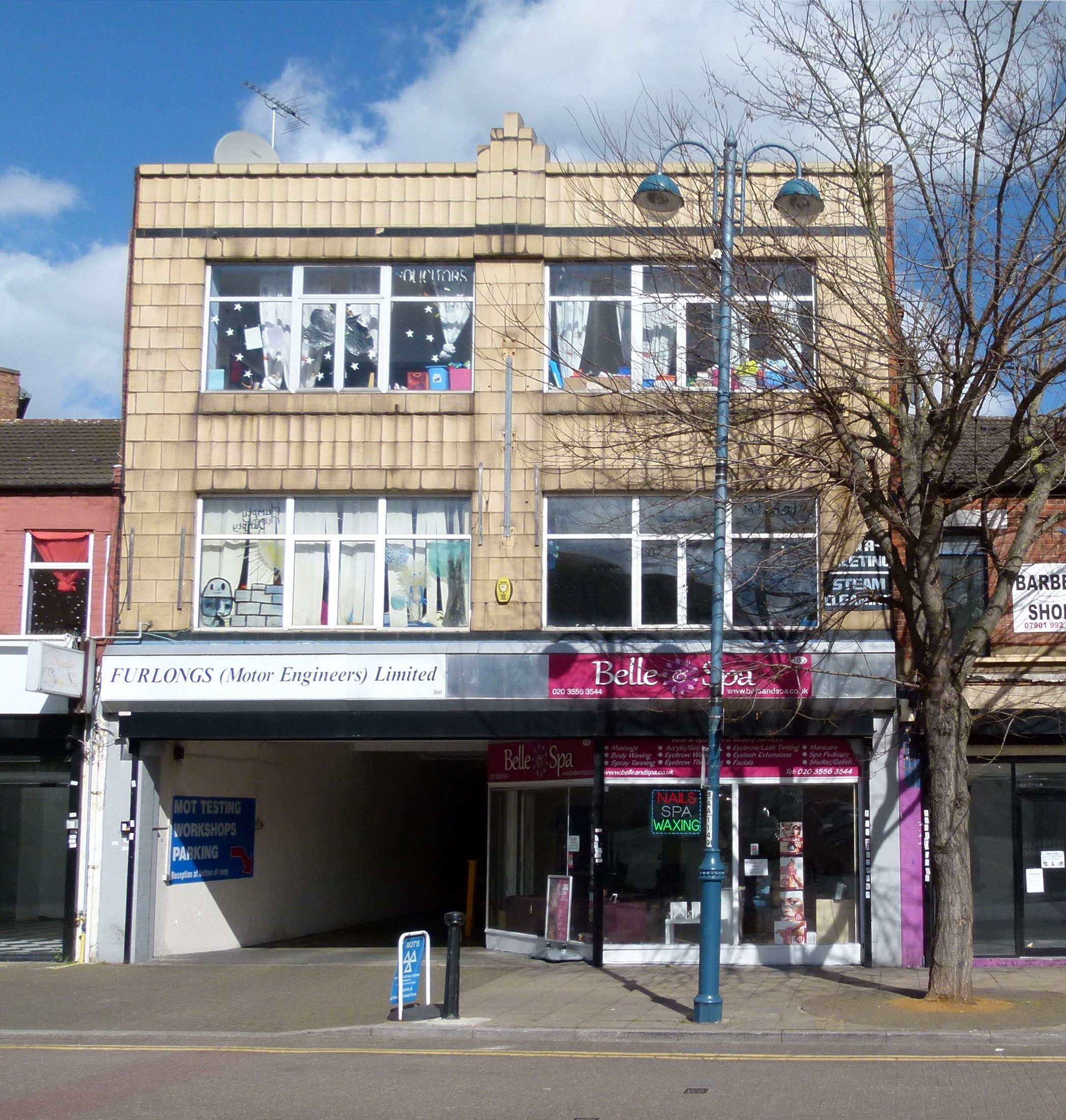
Former showroom Furlongs Garage

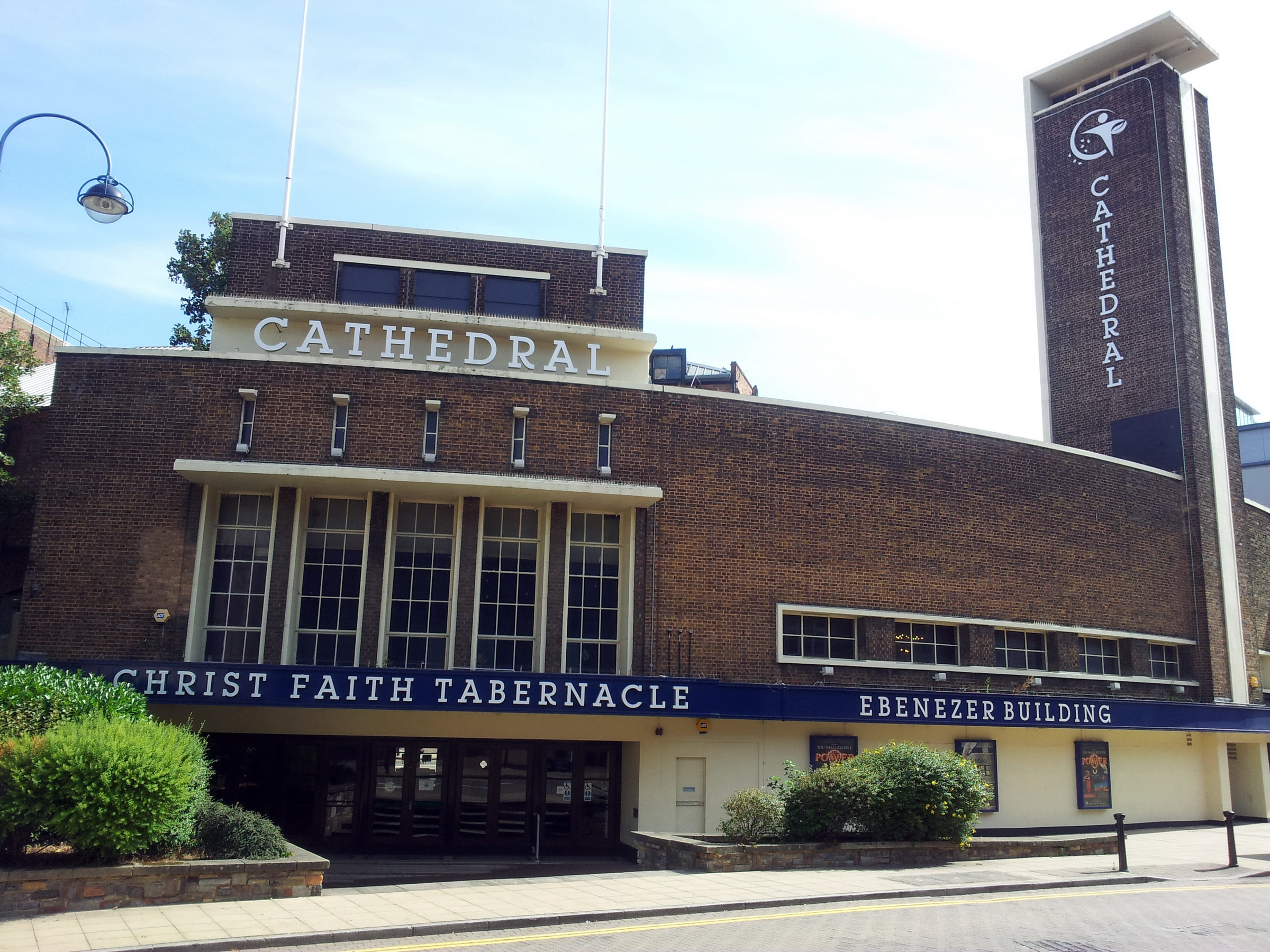
Former Granada Cinema, now a church

== See also ==
- Beresford Square
- Old Woolwich
- Bathway Quarter

== Notes and references ==
Sources

- Bedford, K., Woolwich through time, Amberley Publishing, 2014. ISBN 978 1 4456 1599 8
- Greenwich Council, Woolwich Town Centre Masterplan Supplementary Planning Document, 2012 (PDF online available on royalgreenwich.gov.uk)
- Saint, A., Guillery, P. (ed.), Woolwich – Survey of London, Volume 48, Yale Books, London, 2012. ISBN 978 0 300 18722 9

Notes
