= Munby =

Munby is a surname, and may refer to:

- Alan E. Munby (1870–1938), British architect
- Alan Noel Latimer Munby (1913–1974), British author
- Arthur Munby (1828–1910), British poet and lawyer
- Giles Munby (1813–1876), British botanist
- James Munby (1948–2026), British judge
- Roger Munby (fl. 2000), Chairman of Norwich City FC
- Sarah Munby (born 1981/1982), British civil servant
