= Alan Munby =

Alan Munby may refer to

- Alan E. Munby (1870–1938), British architect
- Alan Noel Latimer Munby (1913–1974), British author
