= Bathway Quarter =

Area of Woolwich, London, England

Coordinates: 51.490283°N 0.06492019°E

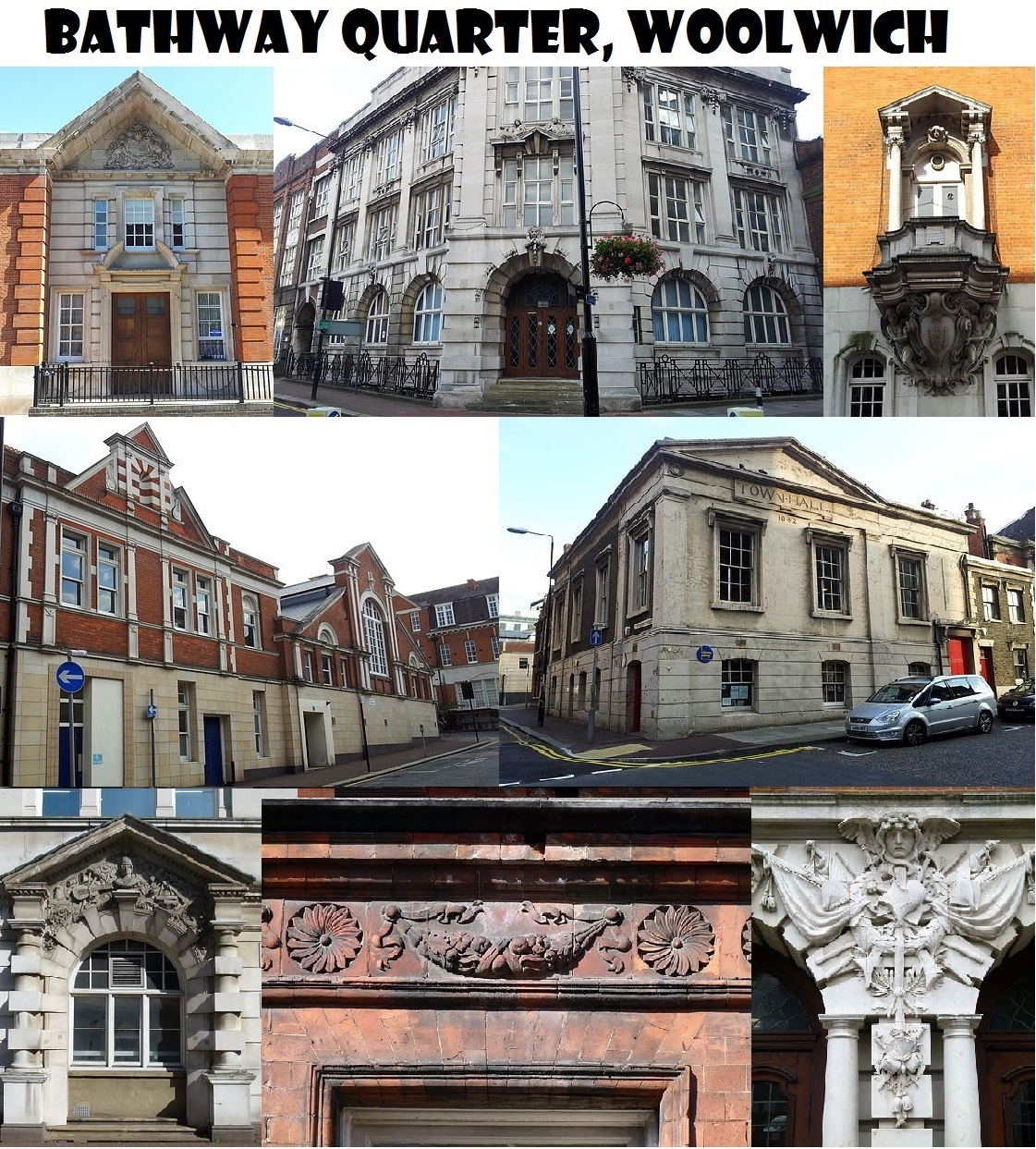
Bathway Quarter Conservation Area. From left to right, top to bottom: Magistrates' Court, Polytechnic Rotunda, Town Hall tower, Public Baths, Old Town Hall, Art & Science School, County Court, Town Hall entrance

Bathway Quarter is an area of historic interest in the centre of Woolwich, South East London. Most buildings in the Bathway Quarter are Grade II*, Grade II or locally listed, while the area as a whole is designated a conservation area by Greenwich Council. With the exception of the Old Town Hall, the listed buildings date from the late-19th or early-20th century. Several were designed by local architect Henry Hudson Church, their civic use reflected in their grand elevations formed of red brick with stone detailing.

== Location ==
The area is bounded by the following streets: Wellington Street to the south, Market Street to the west (a section of the west side of the street is included), Calderwood Street to the north, and Thomas Street to the east. Polytechnic Street divides the quarter in two sections; the western part containing mainly (former) public buildings, the eastern part mainly Polytechnic buildings. The latter forms a solid educational block. Bathway runs east-to-west through the municipal precinct, lending its name to the entire quarter. The Bathway Quarter is close to Woolwich Arsenal station.

== History ==
The area which is now Bathway Quarter was mostly virgin land up till the late-18th century. Old Woolwich was then situated further north, near the Thames and the Woolwich Ferry. A small cluster of cottages stood around Green's End. A few houses of the 1760s survive on Thomas Street, facing General Gordon Square. Formally these are not part of the Bathway Quarter. Concerted development of the area did not begin until after 1799, when the Powis brothers, Greenwich brewers, took a 99-year lease of the land from the Bowater estate. In 1812 most of the land was acquired by Robert Ogilby, an Irish linen merchant.

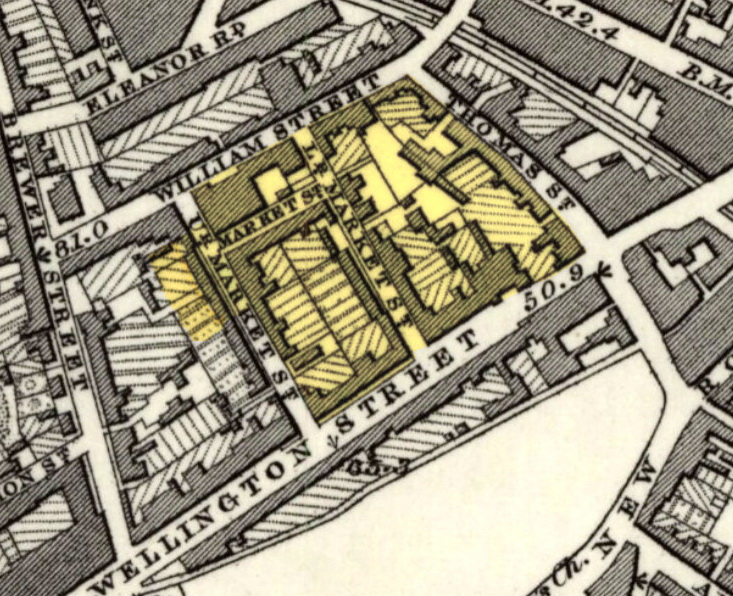
Bathway Quarter on an 1860s Ordnance Survey map

Thomas Street and William Street (now Calderwood Street) were laid out around 1805, taking their names from the Powis brothers. Around the same time, the Board of Ordnance formed Wellington Street to improve road links between the military developments at Woolwich Common and the Royal Arsenal. Wellington Street gradually became an important commercial street, although always secondary to Powis Street. A new market was set up in the area around 1810 but failed to take off and is remembered only in the name of Market Street, where a few houses from this period survive. The Market House had its main entrance on William Street, marked by a turret. On the south side it was bordered by East Street, later renamed Bathway. To either side of the market, Upper and Lower Market Street were laid out (now Market Street and Polytechnic Street).

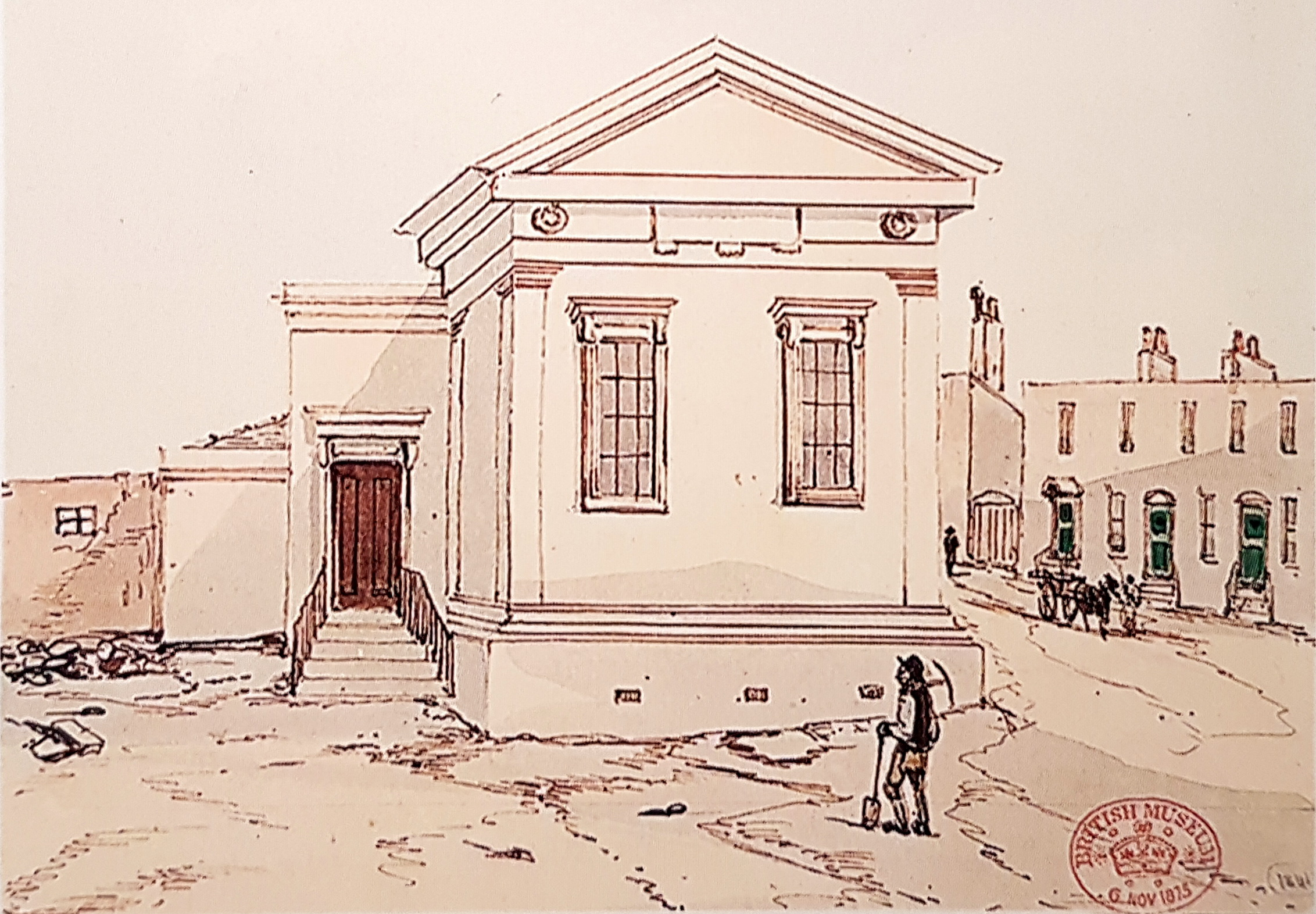
Woolwich Police Court, 1840-1900 (anonymous watercolour, 1841, BL)

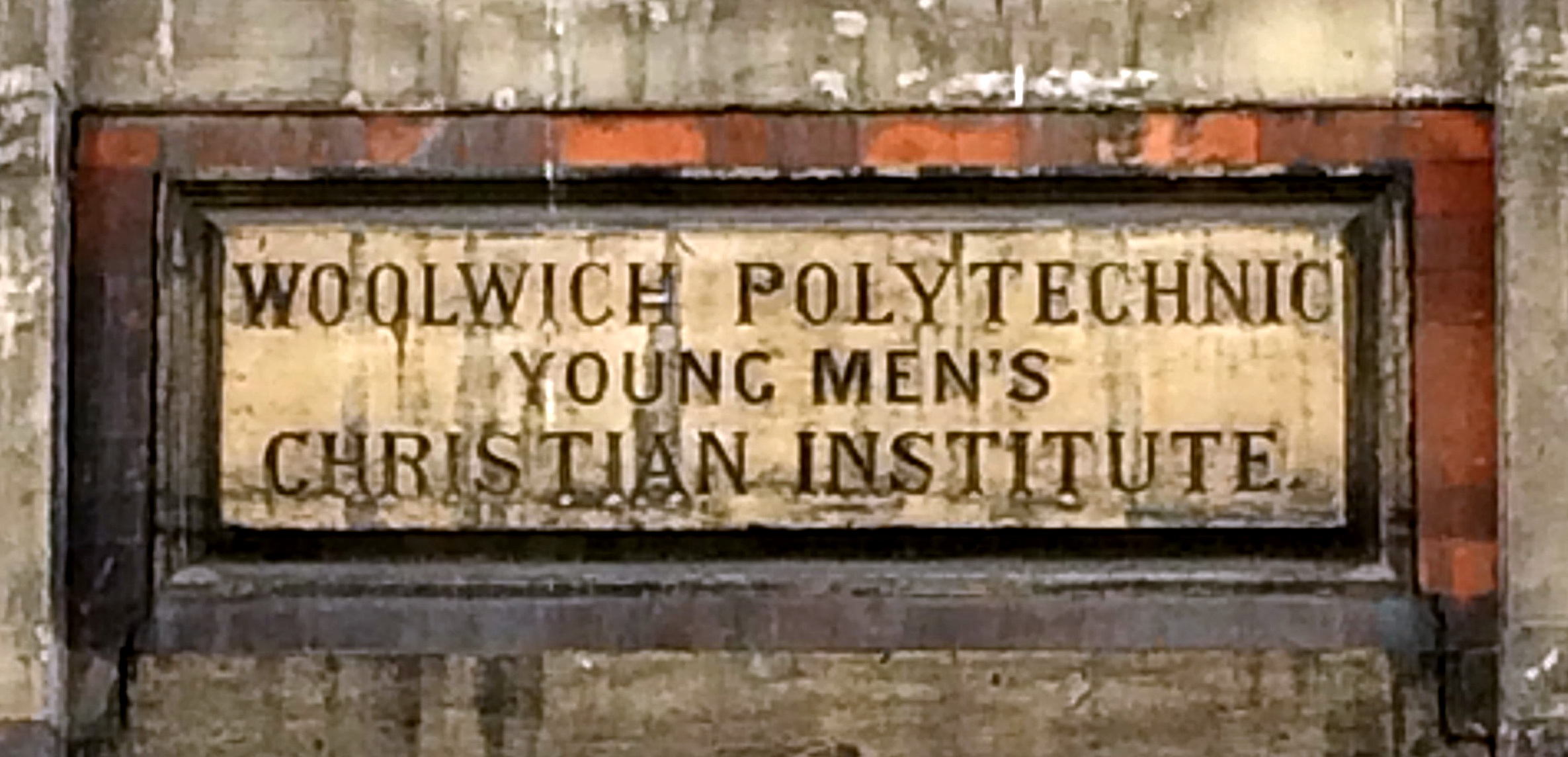
Woolwich Polytechnic, founded in 1891

The first Woolwich Town Hall was built on the corner of William Street and Upper Market Street in 1840 but was sold upon completion to the Metropolitan Police to serve as a court hall, whereupon an almost identical building was erected on the corner of William Street and Lower Market Street to serve as a town hall. The first was demolished around 1900; the latter has survived. The current town hall was built after a design by Alfred Brumwell Thomas in 1903–05. New buildings for the Metropolitan Police (1910) and the Magistrates' Court (1912) formed a small administrative quarter. Other public buildings followed: the public baths (1894), the public library (1901) and a community health center (1939).

The most ambitious private development in this area was the Grand Theatre, built after a design by Bertie Crewe and opened by Sir Henry Irving in 1900 . With a capacity of 1680 it was claimed to be the largest suburban theatre in the country. In 1908 it became the Woolwich Hippodrome with variety shows twice nightly, and by 1923 it was a full-time cinema. The building was demolished in 1939 and rebuilding was stopped by the outbreak of war and only completed in 1955, as the Regal Cinema. From 1982 until its demolition in 2015 it had various uses, of which the nightclub N'tyce was perhaps the most notorious.

Woolwich Polytechnic was founded in 1891 as the Woolwich Polytechnic Young Men's Christian Institute. It was the second-oldest polytechnic in the United Kingdom. The original building from 1891 survives on Calderwood Street, although much altered. Between 1898 and 1965 the institute went through a period of expansion, gradually occupying virtually the eastern half of the Bathway Quarter, with major building campaigns in the 1930s and 1960s. Its dominance of the area is reflected in the name changes of two of the bounding streets: in 1935 Lower Market Street became Polytechnic Street and three years later William Street was renamed Calderwood Street, after a local industrialist and Polytechnic chairman. In 1970, Woolwich Polytechnic merged with various other higher education institutions to form Thames Polytechnic which in 1992 was granted university status and renamed University of Greenwich. By that time the Woolwich site was only one of seven campuses. In 2001 the university abandoned the Woolwich site, only leaving a small administrative presence in the former Woolwich Public Baths. The Polytechnic buildings were acquired by Powis Street Estates Ltd. in 2003 and renamed Island Business Centre with mixed commercial and educational use.

== Future plans ==
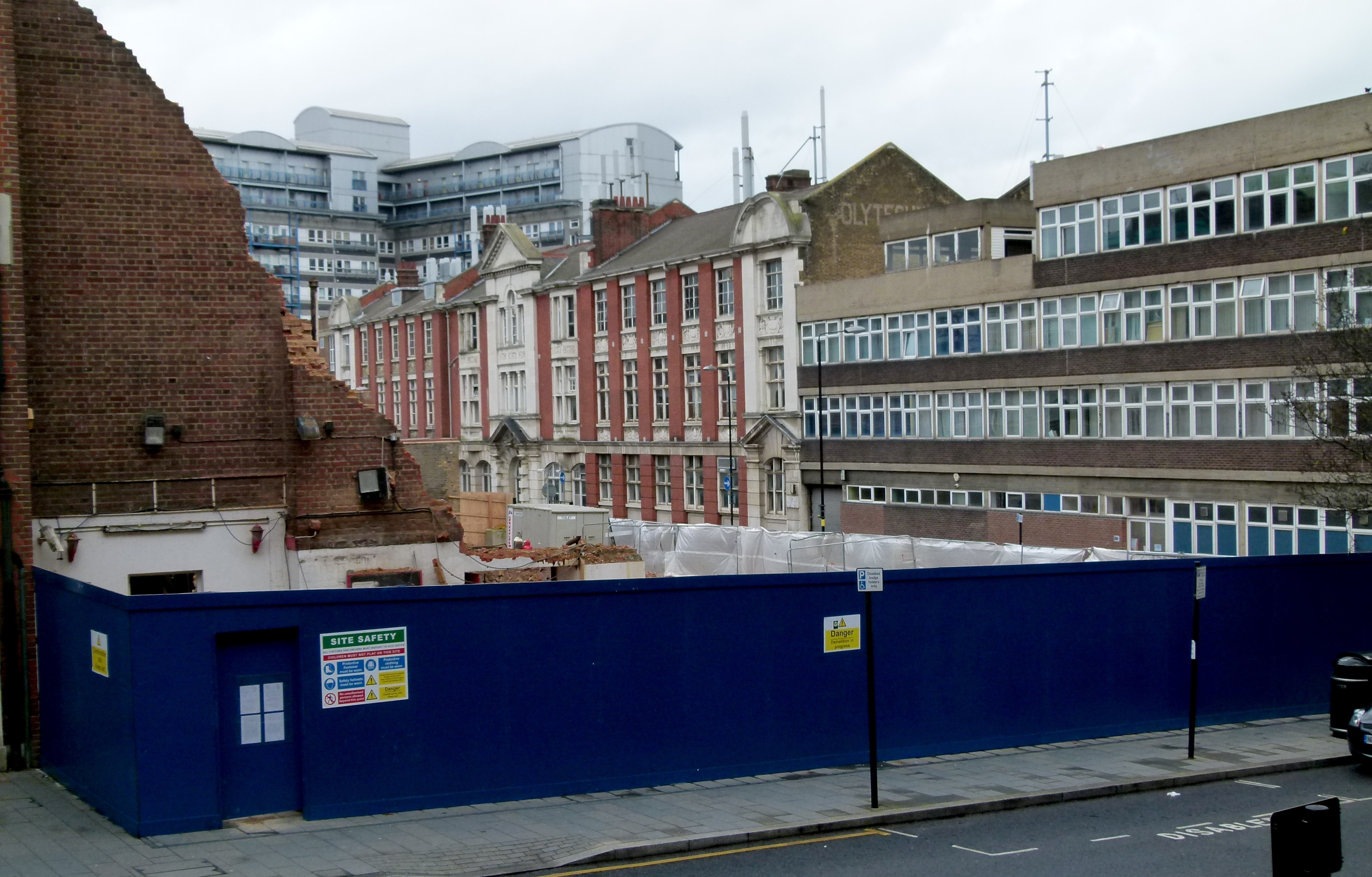
Construction site former Grand Theatre. To the right: Polytechnic building to be demolished

In the London Plan of 2004-16, Woolwich is identified as an "opportunity area", as well as one of Greater London's major centres (currently 35) that has the potential to become a metropolitan centre (currently 13). In order to achieve this, Greenwich Council aims to strengthen Woolwich' historic town function as a major employment, shopping and leisure centre, as well as improving the design of its buildings, streets and open spaces. The Woolwich Town Centre Masterplan Supplementary Planning Document, adopted by Greenwich Council in 2012, designated the Bathway Quarter, together with the Powis Street and Hare Street area, a future conservation area, the third in Woolwich after the Royal Arsenal and Woolwich Common. According to the masterplan, the Bathway Quarter "has the potential to be a high quality, high-specification, loft-style place with bars, galleries and artists’ studios together with other uses such as a jazz club and creative industries such as architect's studios". In May 2019, the Bathway Quarter became part of the Woolwich Conservation Area, including also Beresford Square, Greens End, General Gordon Square, parts of Woolwich New Road (including St Peter's Roman Catholic Church), Powis Street, Hare Street, Mortgramit Square, parts of Woolwich High Street (south) and St Mary's Church and Gardens.

Most of the civic buildings in the area are no longer in use as such, with the exception of the town hall which has spilled over across the road (The Woolwich Centre, 2013). The Old Public Library now houses Greenwich Local Labour and Business. The Magistrates' Court building has been converted into apartments and similar plans exist for the police station. In 2015, the former Grand Theatre was demolished after a plan for a residential building on this site was approved. In 2016, a plan was presented for the redevelopment of the so-called Island Site, the eastern section of the Bathway Quarter. The plan entails the restoration of the historic buildings, demolition of buildings considered non-historic, and the creation of a new entertainment quarter including a cinema, cafés, restaurants and food and beverage shops.

== Heritage ==
=== Wellington Street ===
Woolwich Town Hall is a fine example of Edwardian Baroque in the London area. The Grade-II* listed building has two monumental façades, the main entrance facing Wellington Street. The imposing entrance of Portland stone has a colonnade and "broken" pediments. Its 40 m high clock tower can be seen from afar. Next to the town hall the former site of the Grand Theatre awaits redevelopment. The façade of the Polytechnic block on Wellington Street consists largely of a Brutalist L-shaped building that continues on Polytechnic Street (various architects, led by George Trevett, 1962–63; nominated for demolition in 2016). The eastern part of the street consists of several late-Victorian commercial buildings from the 1890s. The corner building, formerly the London and Provincial Bank, and the adjacent building, now boarded up, were both designed by Henry Hudson Church. The south side of Wellington Street, with the new Public Library and council offices, is not part of the Bathway Quarter.

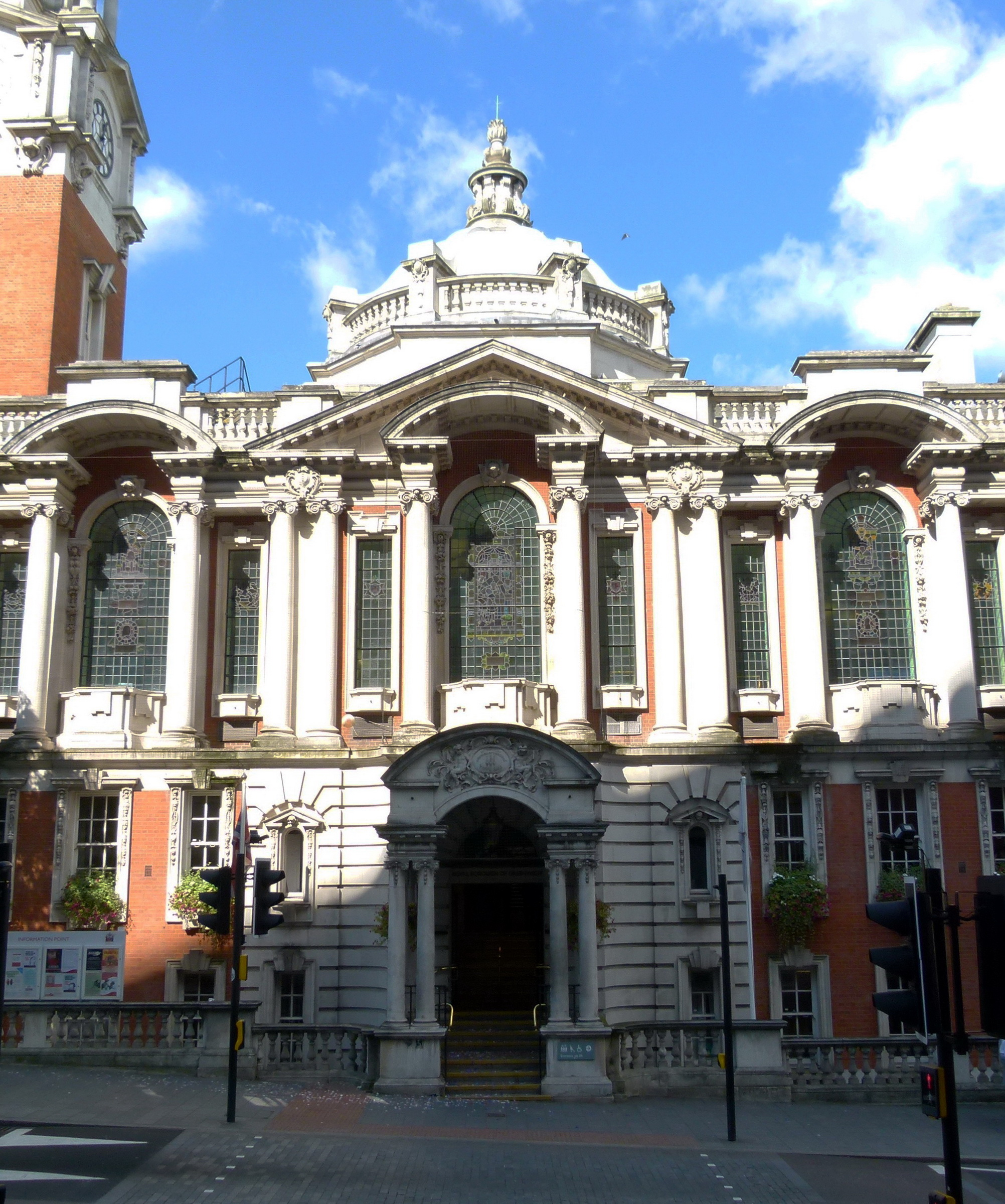
Main façade Town Hall

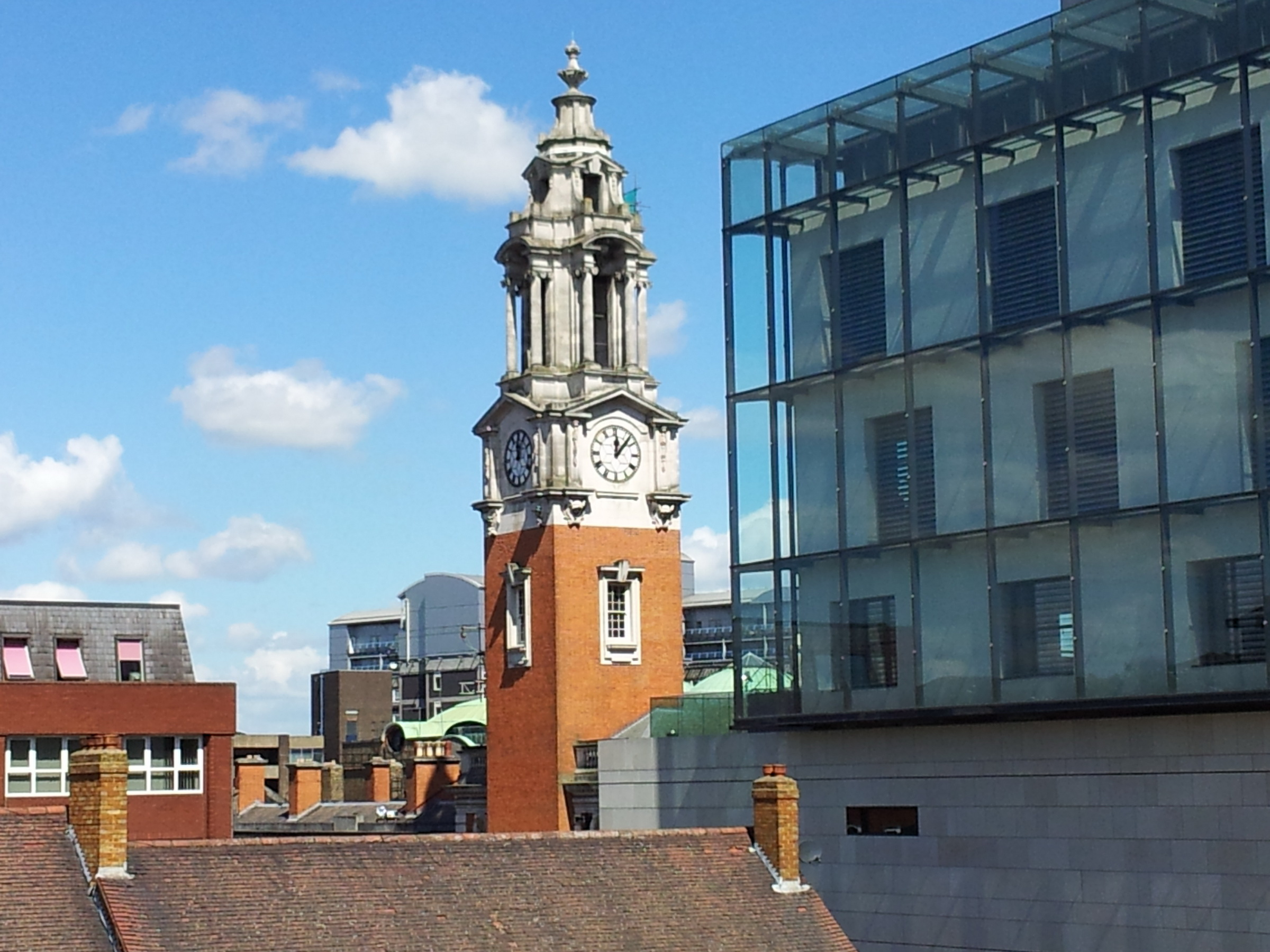
Clock tower from afar

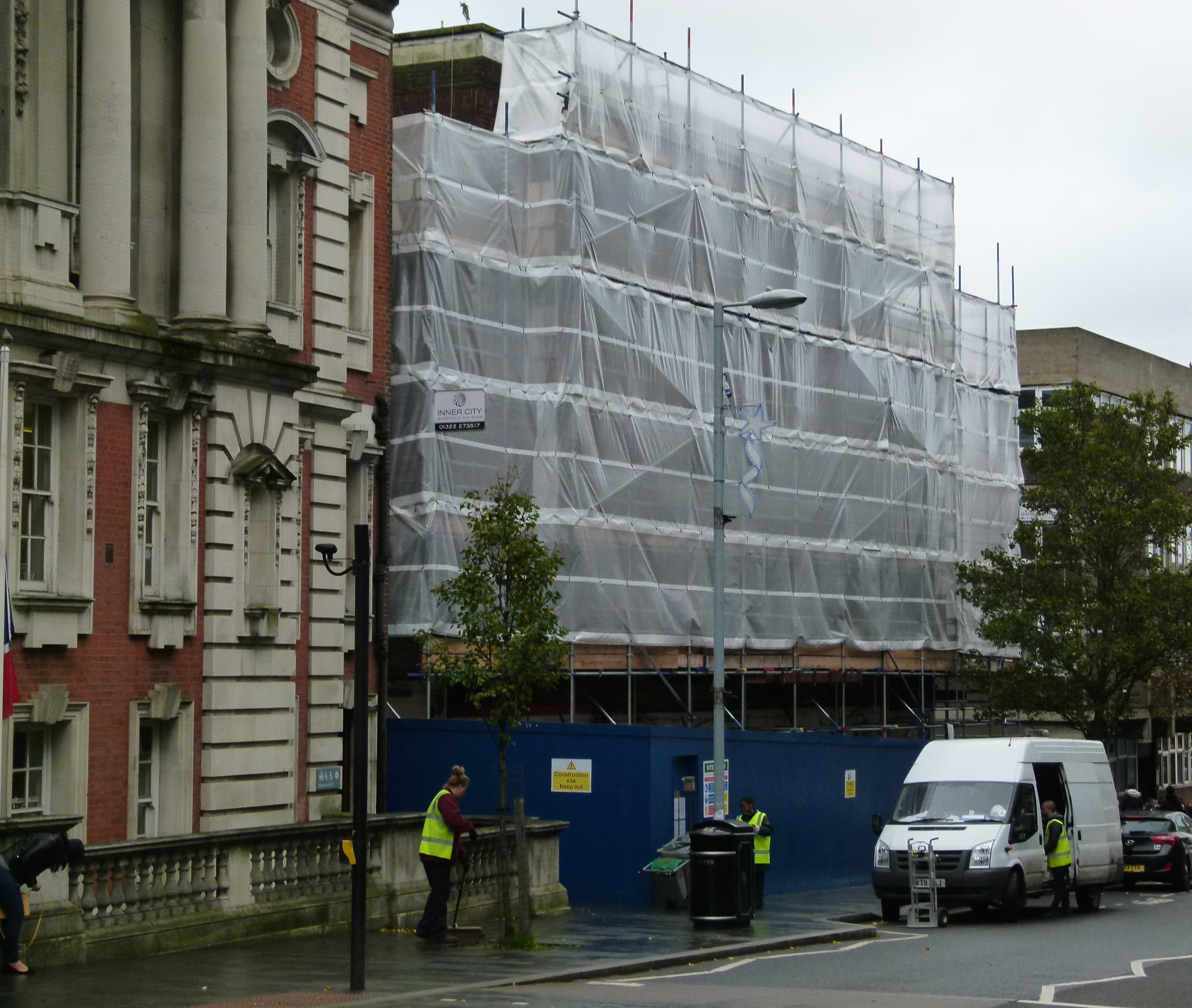
Demolition Grand Theatre

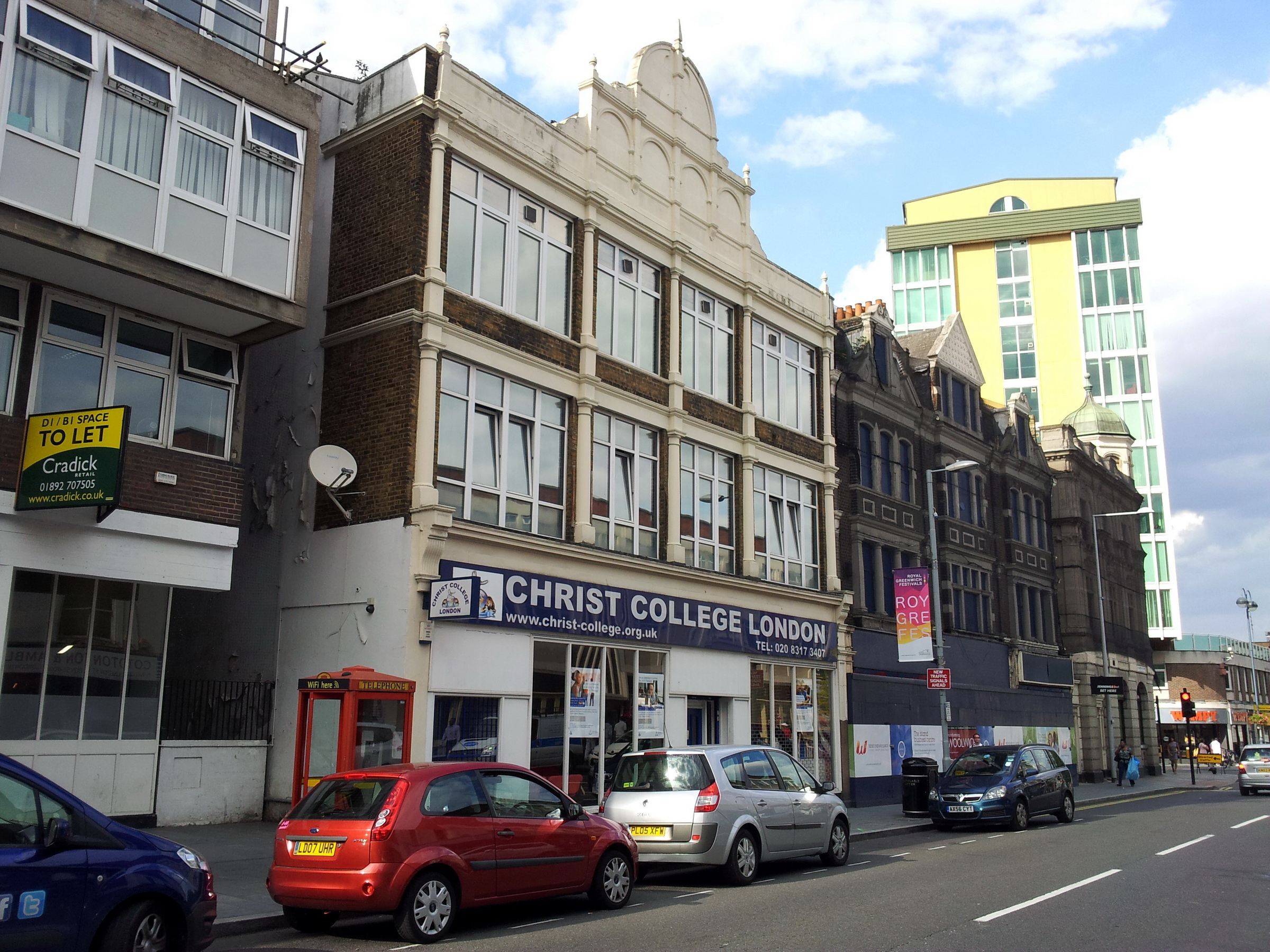
Late-Victorian façades

=== Bathway ===
The south side of this street is dominated by the Victorian brick and Portland stone façade of the Woolwich Public Baths (H.H. Church, 1892–94). The building had five entrances (separate entrances for women and first and second-class men) and contained two large swinging pools, 52 slipper baths (private baths), a wash house and a laundry. The baths were modernized around 1960 and closed in 1982, after which it was used as a community centre and then as a students' union of the University of Greenwich. After the departure of the university from Woolwich, it has served as an administrative building and a rehearsal studio for drama students. Until recently, all the buildings on the north side of the street were part of the municipal enclave. The Magistrates' Court building (John Dixon Butler, 1911–12) had its main entrance on Market Street. The neo-classical building next to it was the rear elevation of the Woolwich Public Library, designed by H.H. Church in 1897 and built in 1900-01. Adjacent, a soup kitchen of 1913-14 was converted into a reading room for the library in 1979. The library closed in 2011 and was relocated consequently at The Woolwich Centre, opposite the town hall on Wellington Street. For the building on the corner of Polytechnic Street, see below.

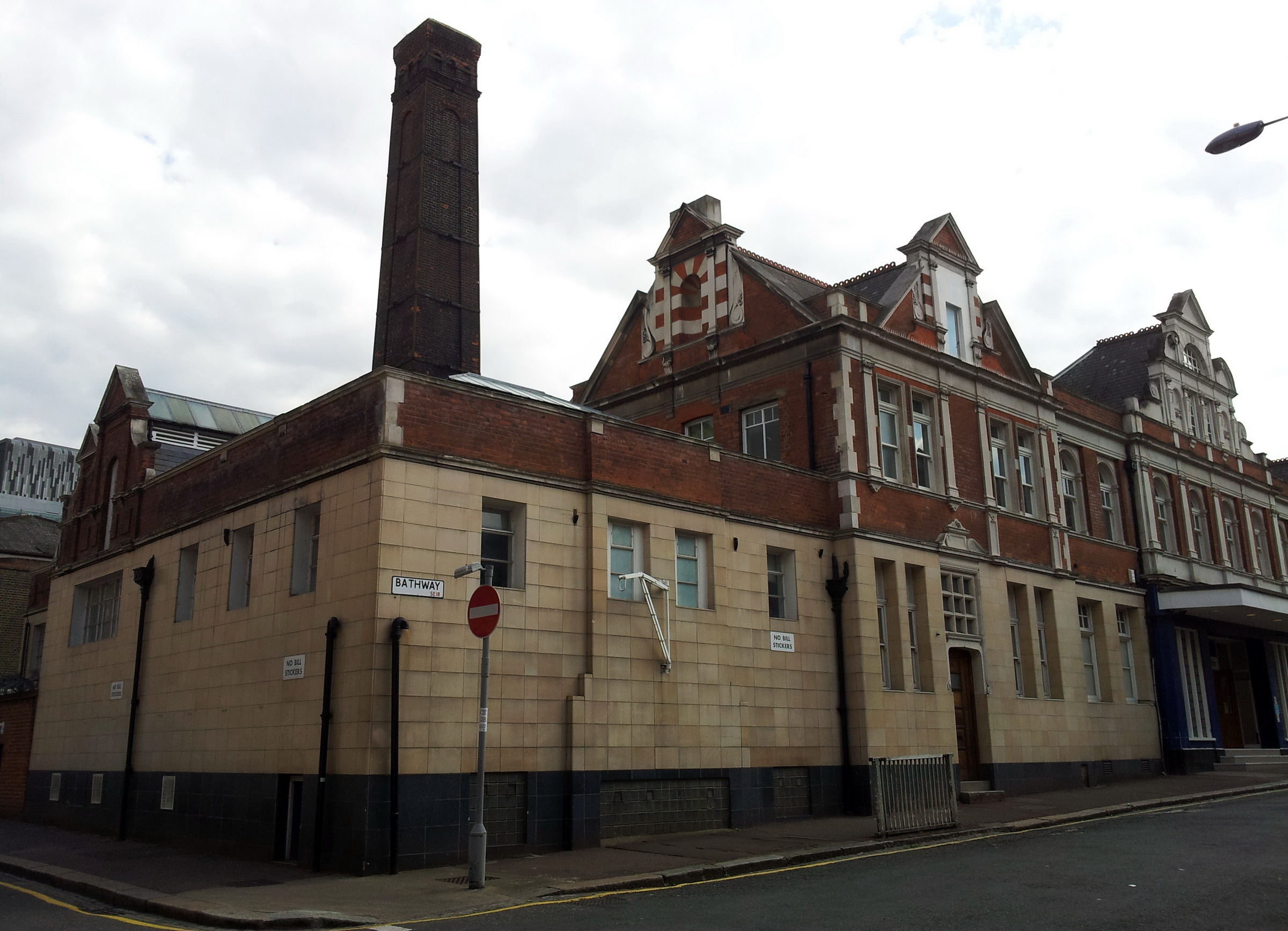
Public Baths

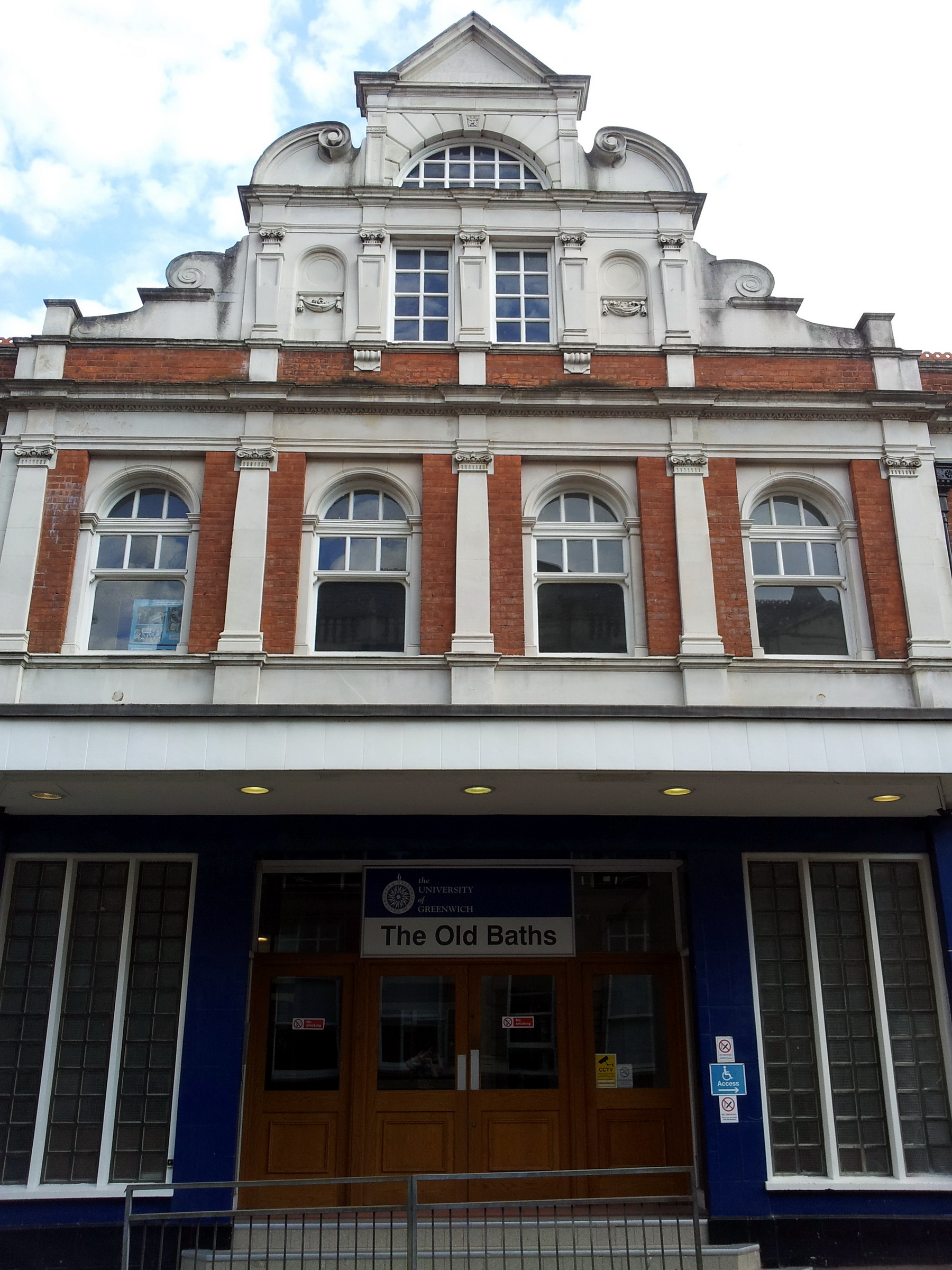
Detail Public Baths

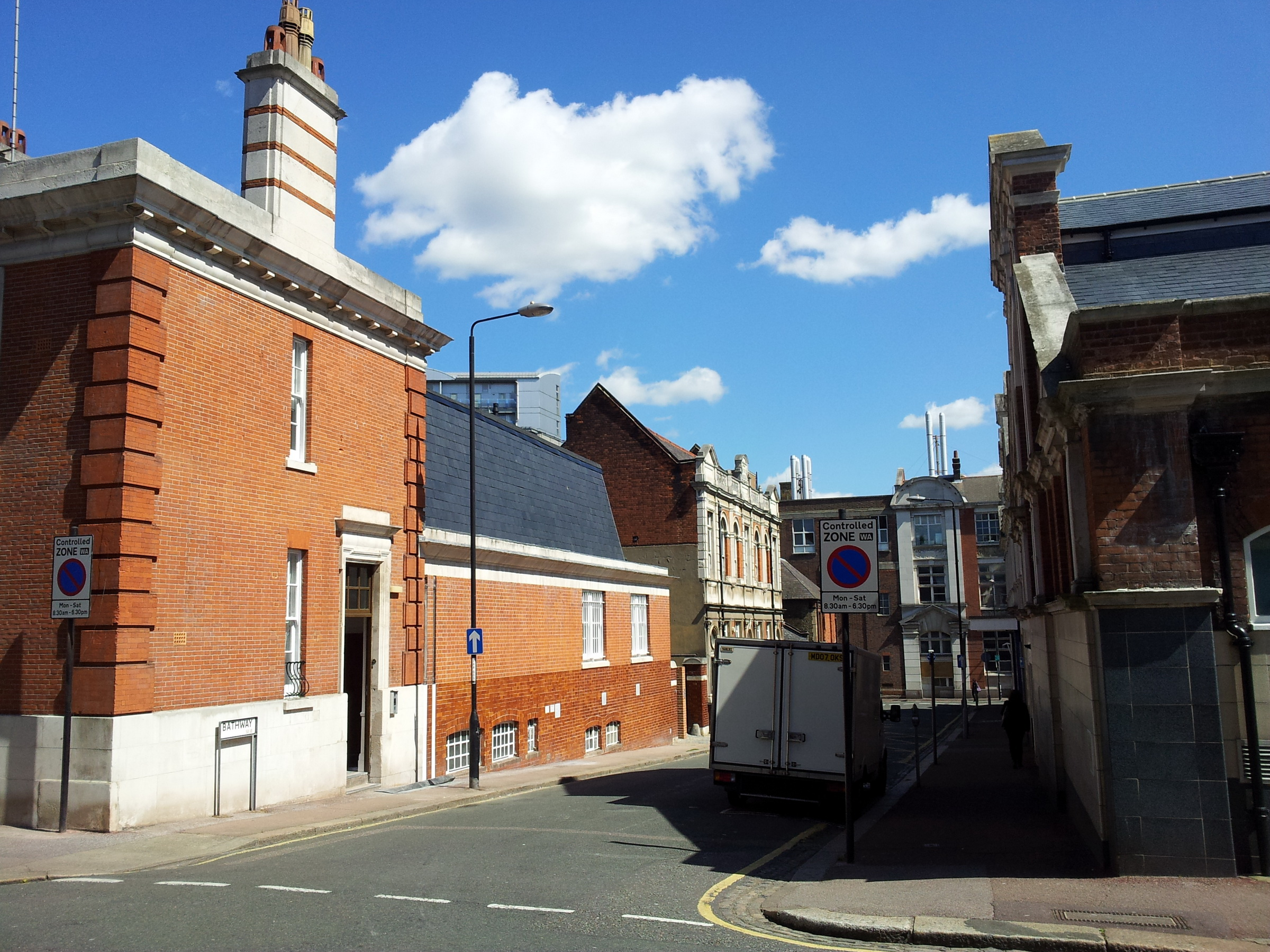
Former Magistrates' Court

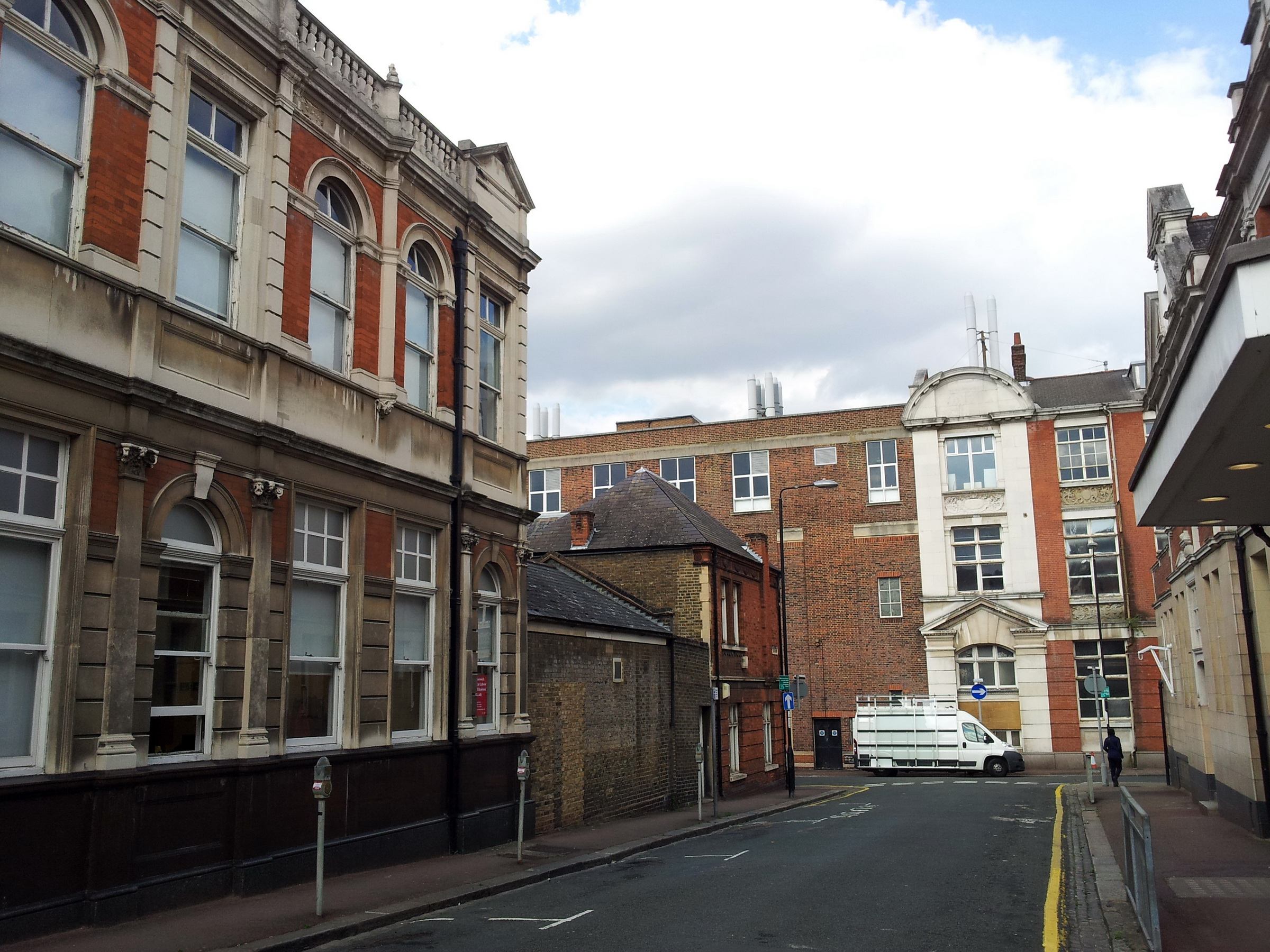
Rear elevation Public Library

=== Calderwood Street ===
The failed Market House of 1810 was replaced by the Police Court in 1840, and then by the Magistrates' Court in 1910. The Police Station next door made room for the Public Library, designed by H.H. Church in 1897 and opened by Lord Avebury in 1901. It features a busy façade of red brick and Portland stone with a large bay window. The plinth of red Aberdeen granite contains a commemoration stone with a dedication and the names of the Woolwich Board of Health, which helped establishing the library. The Old Town Hall further down the road was almost identical with the Police Court, but unlike the latter it survived: a handsome classical structure with a pediment below which "Town Hall" is inscribed (Th. Kinton & G.H. Graham, 1841–42). On the opposite corner with Polytechnic Street stood the Duke of Wellington public house, which in 1935 had to make room for a new lecture hall of the Woolwich Polytechnic. The hall was designed by the head of the Polytechnic building department, James H. Anderson, with classic proportions and Bath stone detailing to mirror the Old Town Hall across the street. Further east and slightly set back, a large detached house from 1808 was owned by the architect Henry Hudson Church who enlarged it in 1860. In 1891 Church incorporated it in the original building of Woolwich Polytechnic. The house survived numerous proposals for rebuilding "like a small nut in a large lump of toffee". The brick-and-terracotta Polytechnic building has lost its western bay, two Baroque turrets and other flourishes. Behind the façade, Church's house can still be admired, as well as an 1892 gymnasium with an open wooden-trussed roof. For the corner building, see Thomas Street below. The north side of Calderwood Street is not included in the designated conservation area.

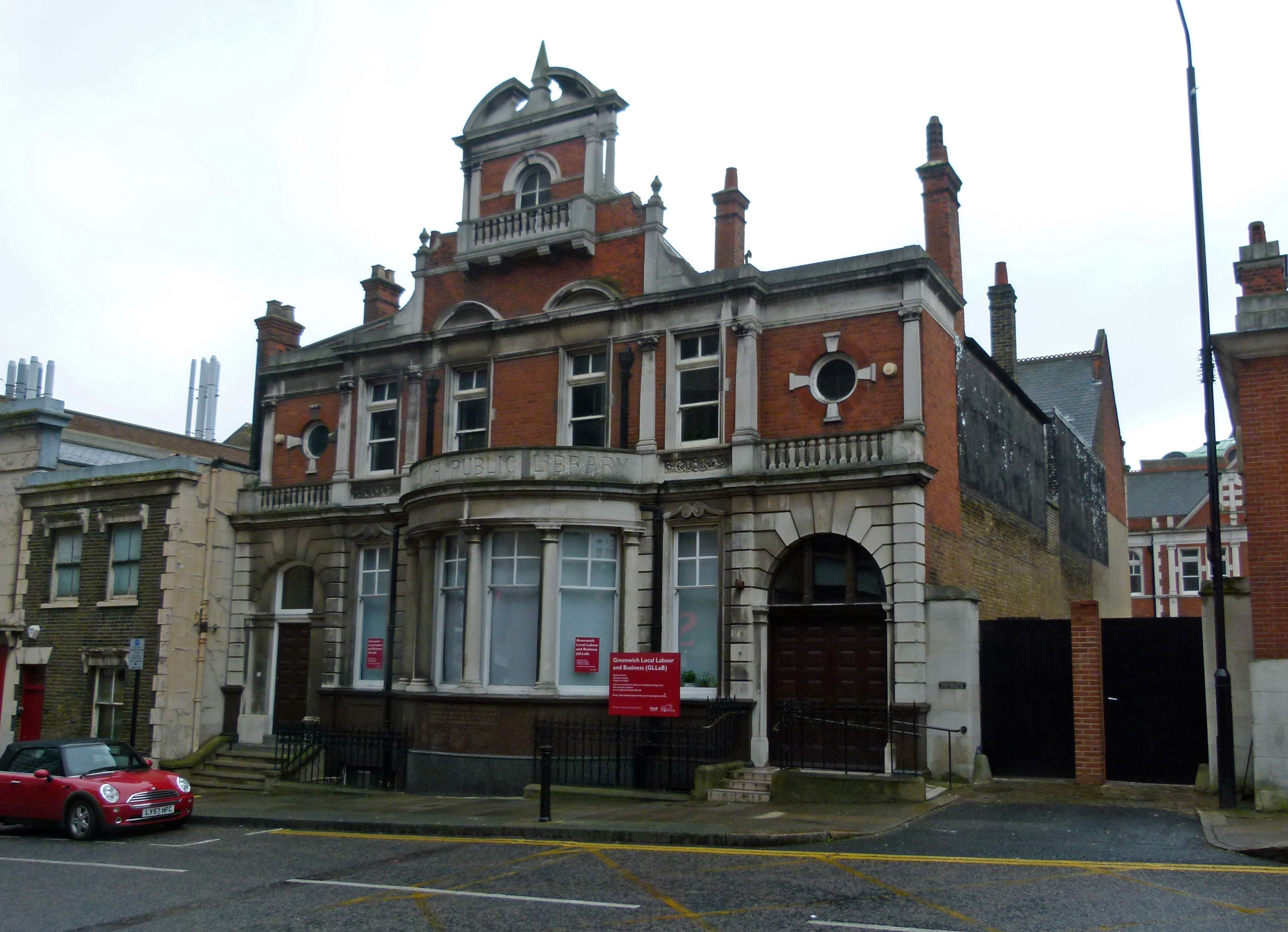
Old Public Library

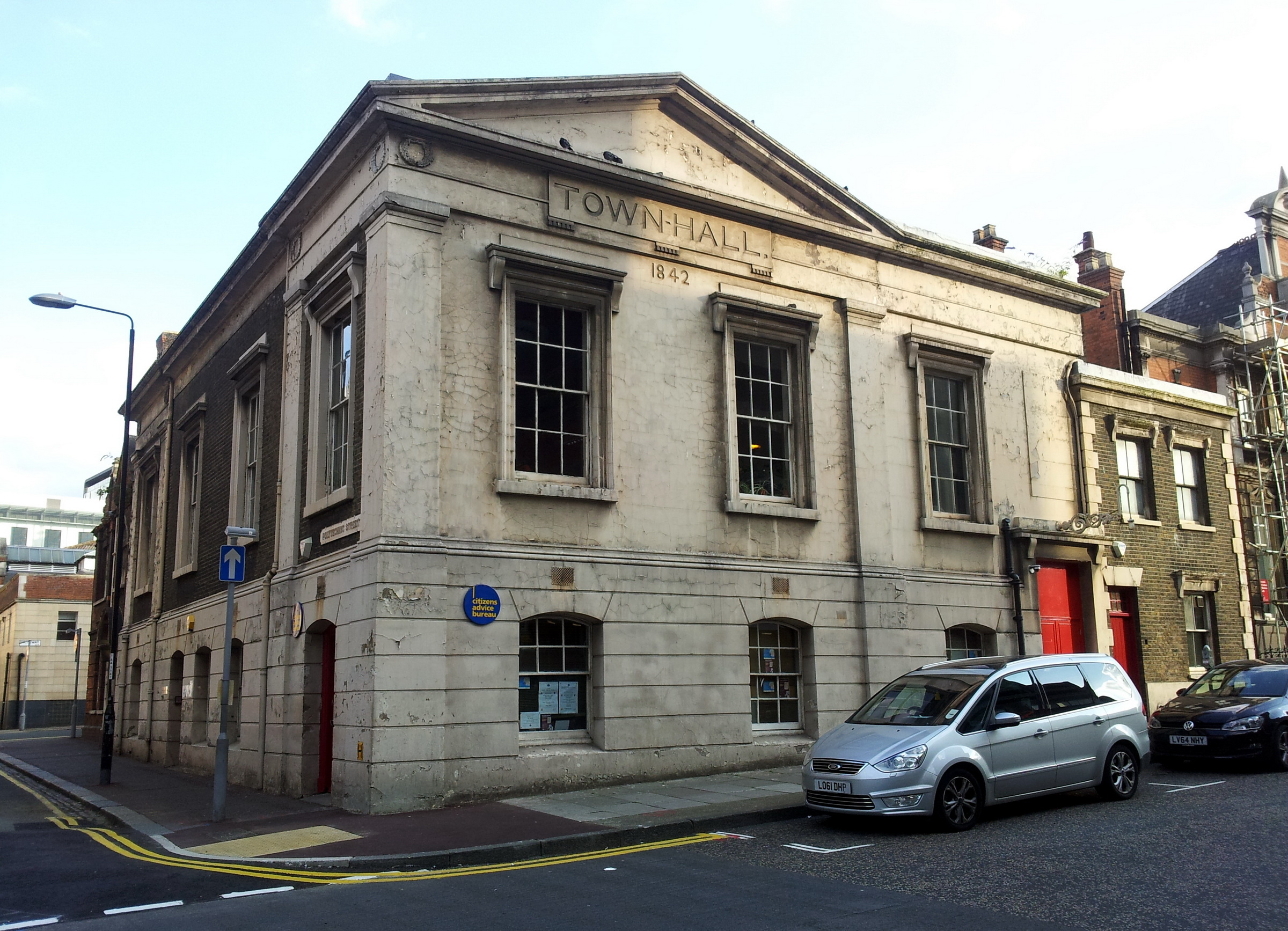
Old Town Hall

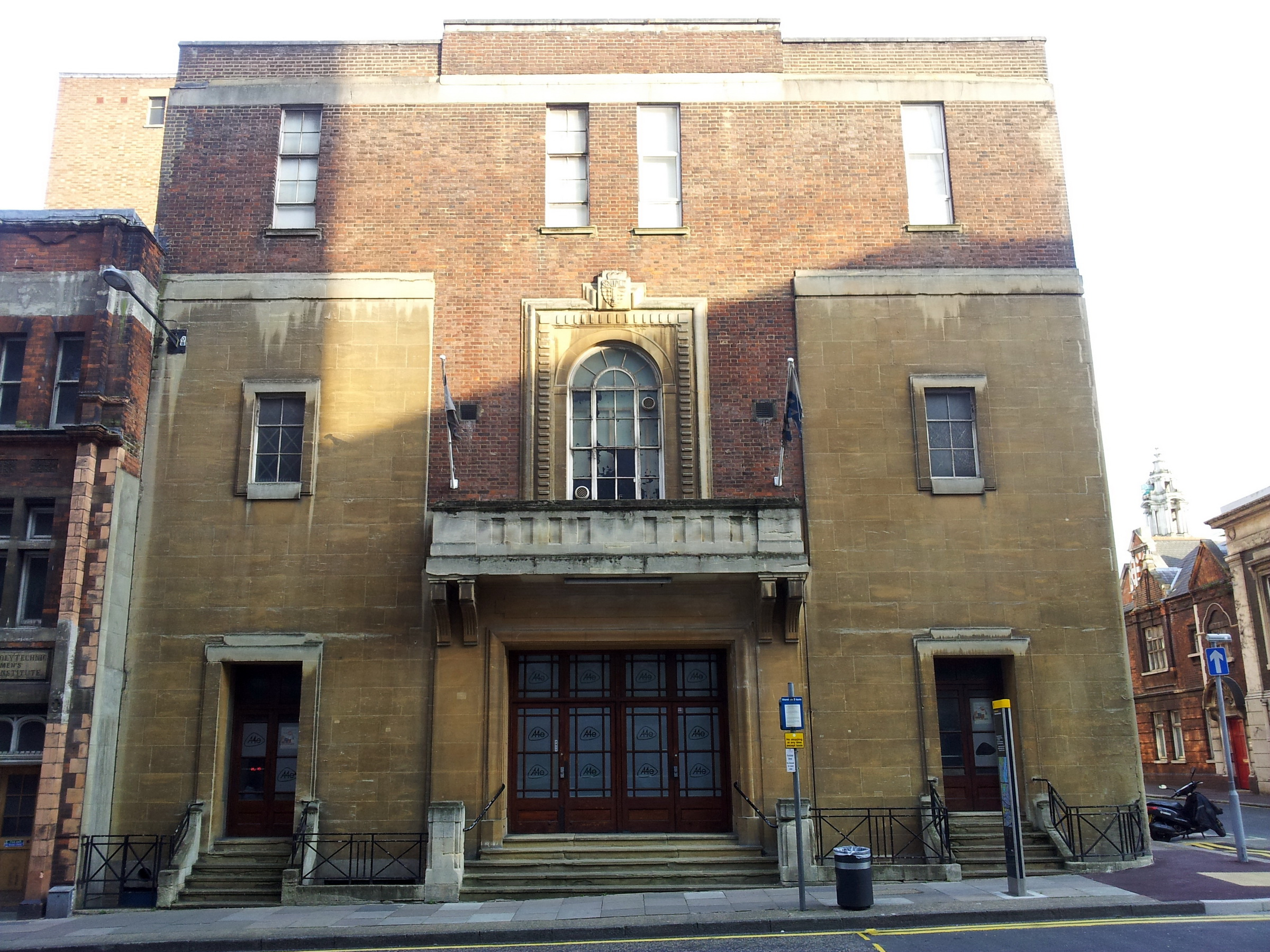
Polytechnic Hall

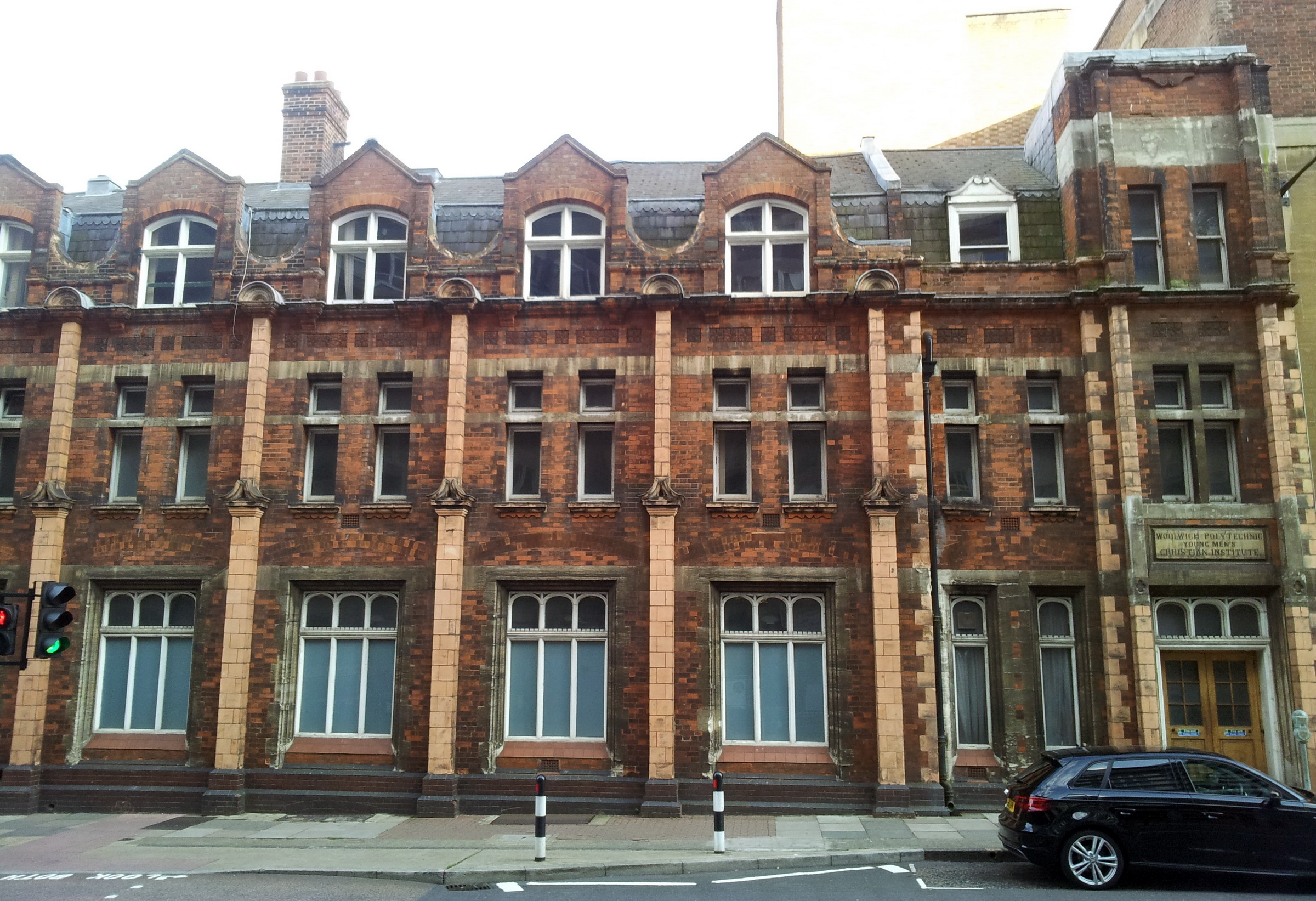
Oldest Polytechnic building

=== Market Street ===
The red-brick gable of Woolwich Town Hall stretches along the southwestern section of Market Street. The Italianate clock tower near the Wellington Street corner rises up 40 meters and has rich ornaments in white stone. The side entrance of the town hall further down the road is ornamented with military and maritime symbols. Adjacent is the red-brick west façade of the Woolwich Public Baths, simpler than the main façade on Bathway, this section being the second-class part. The façade of the former Magistrates' Court (John Dixon Butler, 1911–12, now a residential building) takes up the northwestern section of the street. On the east side of Market Street only the former police station (J.D. Butler, 1909–10) and a row of early Victorian houses are included in the Bathway Quarter conservation area. Other buildings such as the Woolwich Central Health Centre and the Jobcentre Plus are not.

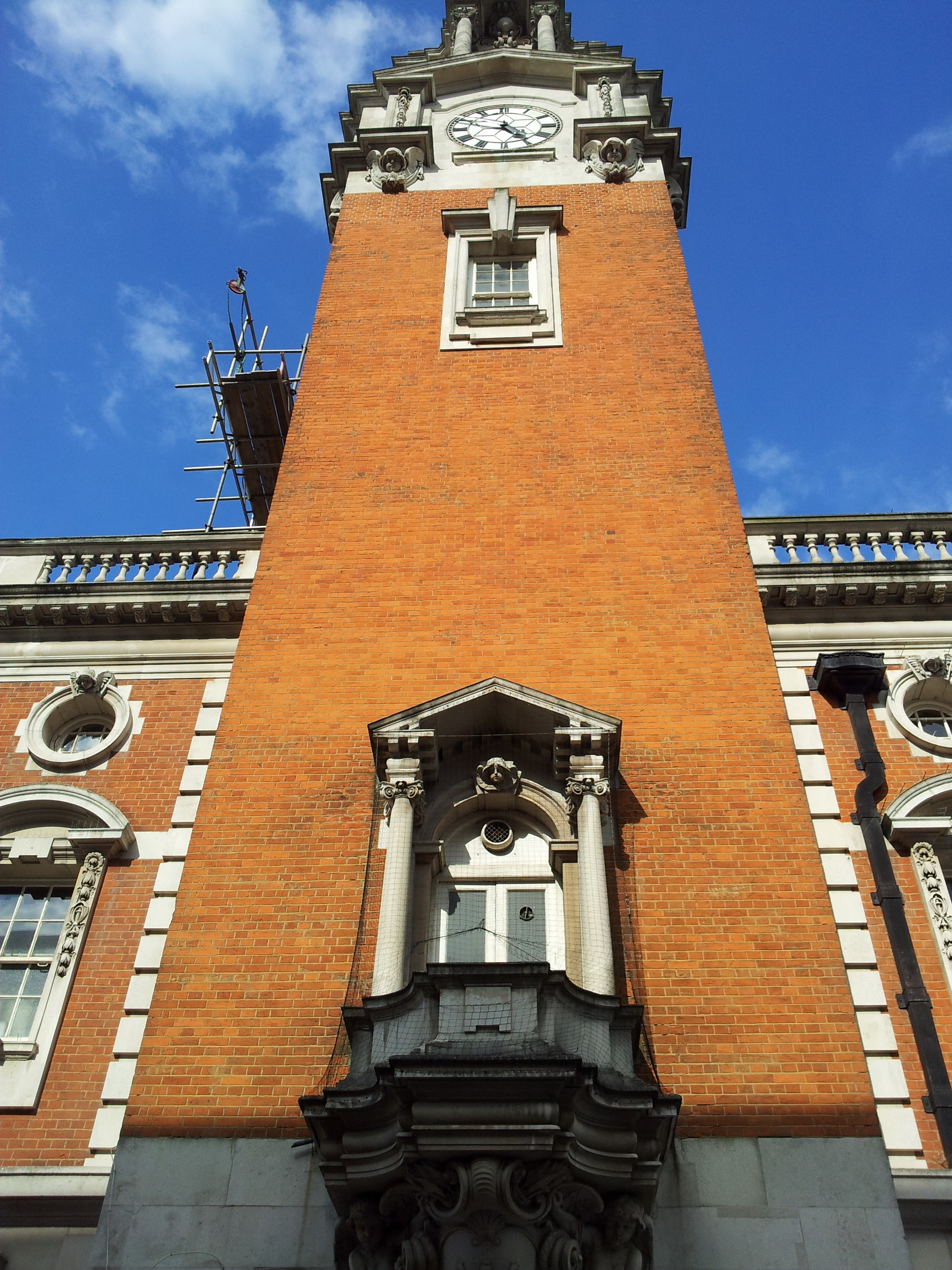
Town Hall clock tower

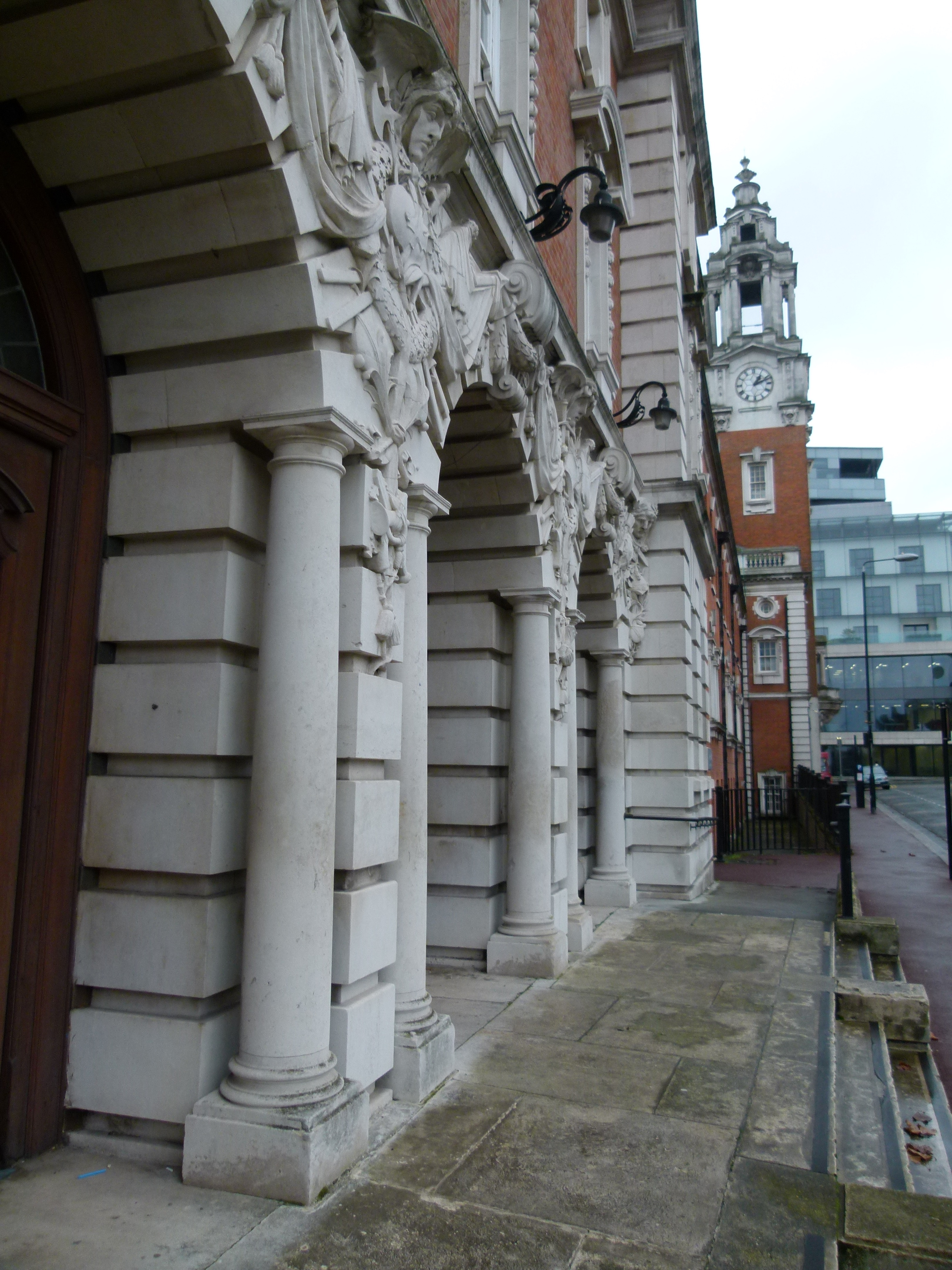
Town Hall entrance, detail

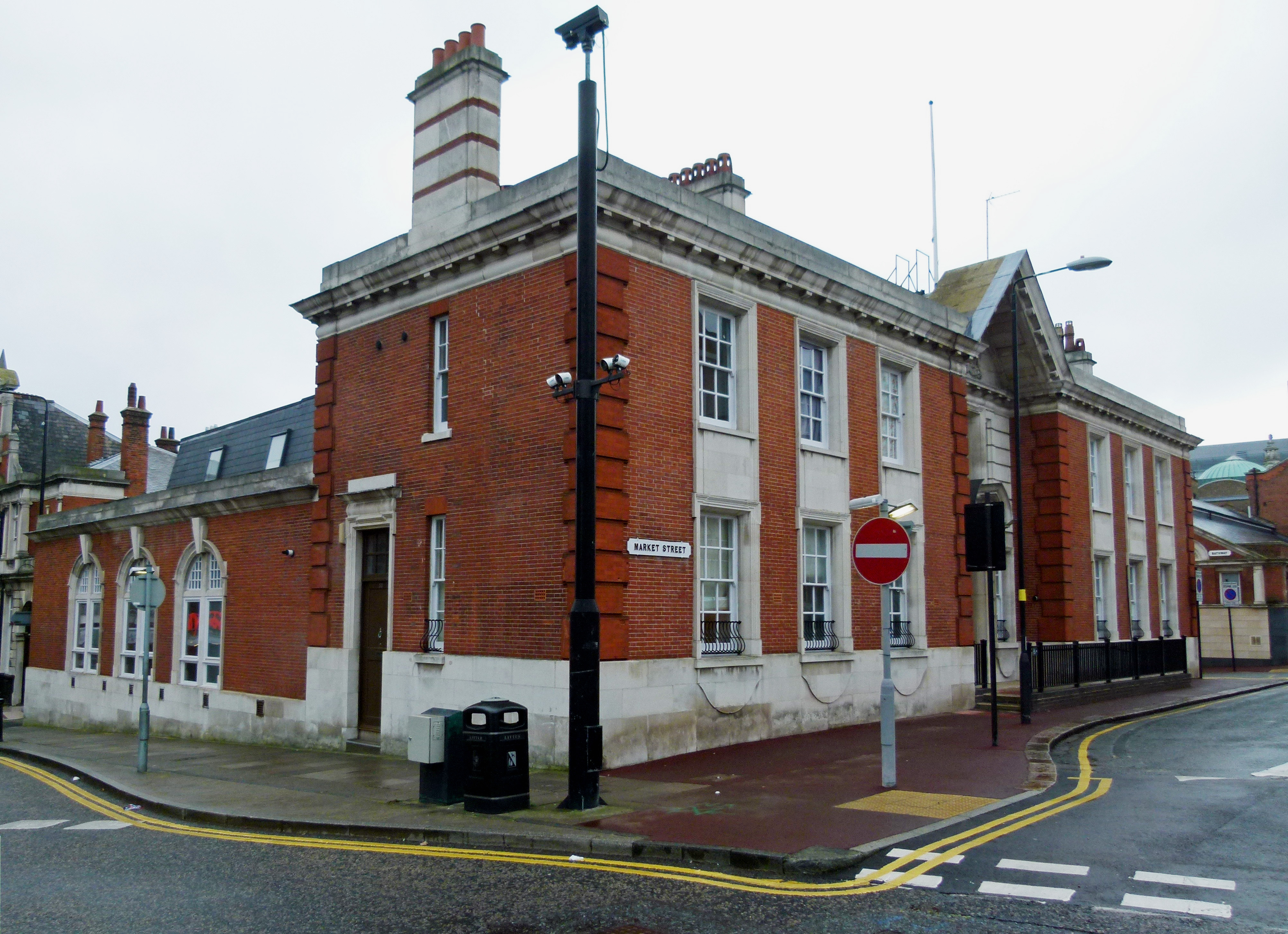
Former Magistrates' Court

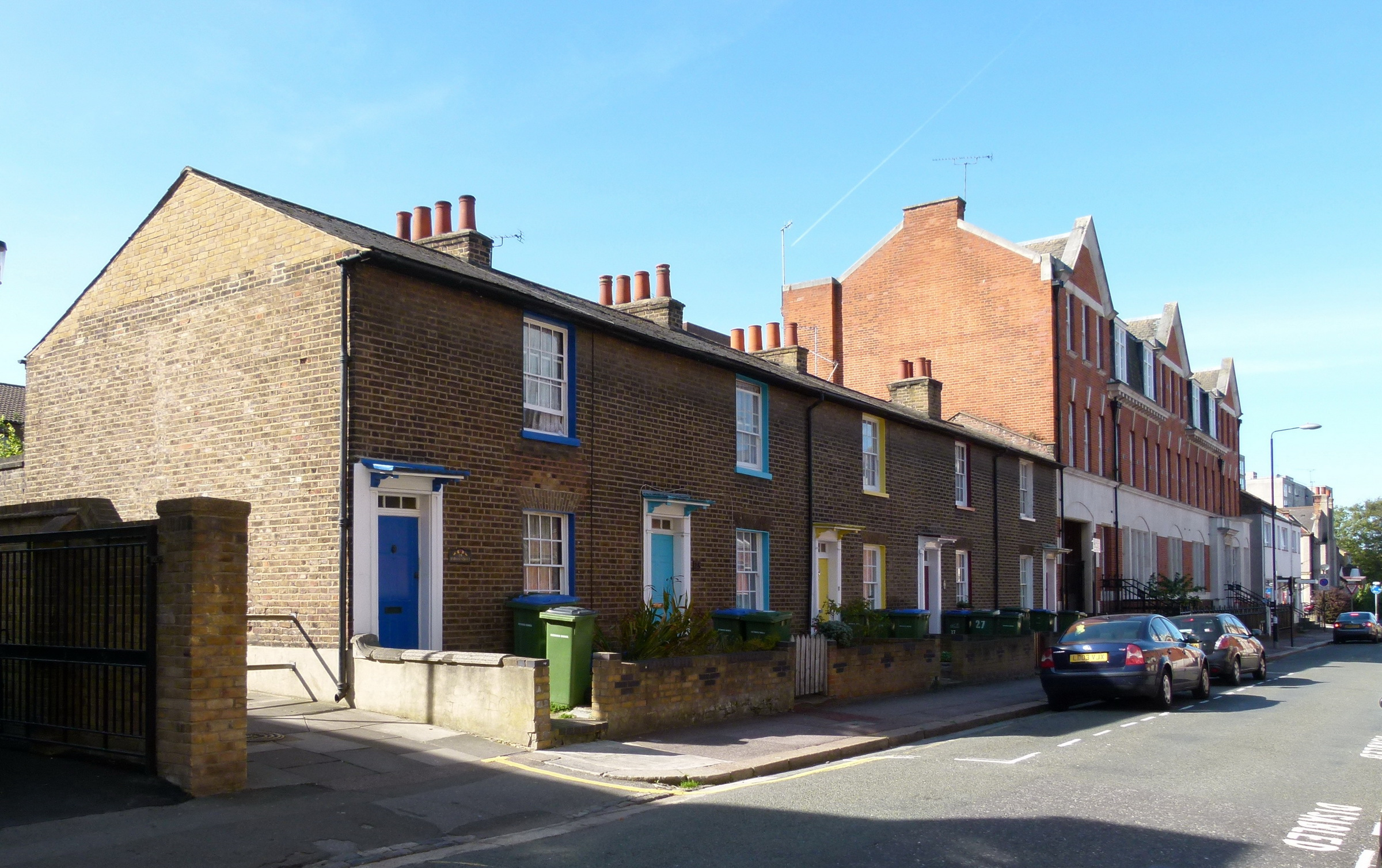
Victorian houses & police station

=== Polytechnic Street ===
The largely post-war Woolwich Grand Theatre was demolished in 2015, the vacant site offering surprising views of the back of Woolwich Town Hall. Adjacent to the construction site, a modest town hall annex was added in 1929–30. A tapering square brick chimney (25 m tall) towers over the former wash house and laundry of the Woolwich Public Baths. The cream-coloured tiles on the lower part of the building date from a 1959-60 modernization campaign. North of Bathway, a richly-ornamented corner building designed by H.H. Church in 1892 served as the county court, which by that time also made use of the Old Town Hall, further north. The building is of red brick dressed with stone and terracotta decorations. Its Dutch gables are repeated in the almost simultaneously-built Public Baths. The east side of the street is entirely occupied by former Polytechnic buildings. From north to south: the Polytechnic Lecture Hall (J.H. Anderson, 1935–36), the Art and Science School (H.H. Church, 1898), and the Brutalist L-shaped building that continues on Wellington Street (various architects, led by George Trevett, 1962–63). The latter building will be demolished in the Island Site plans, while the Art and Science School is to be adapted for residential use; its entrance opposite Bathway will give access to the future entertainment area inside the block. The sculpted entrance of Portland stone is enriched by a bust of Athena and attributes of music and architecture.

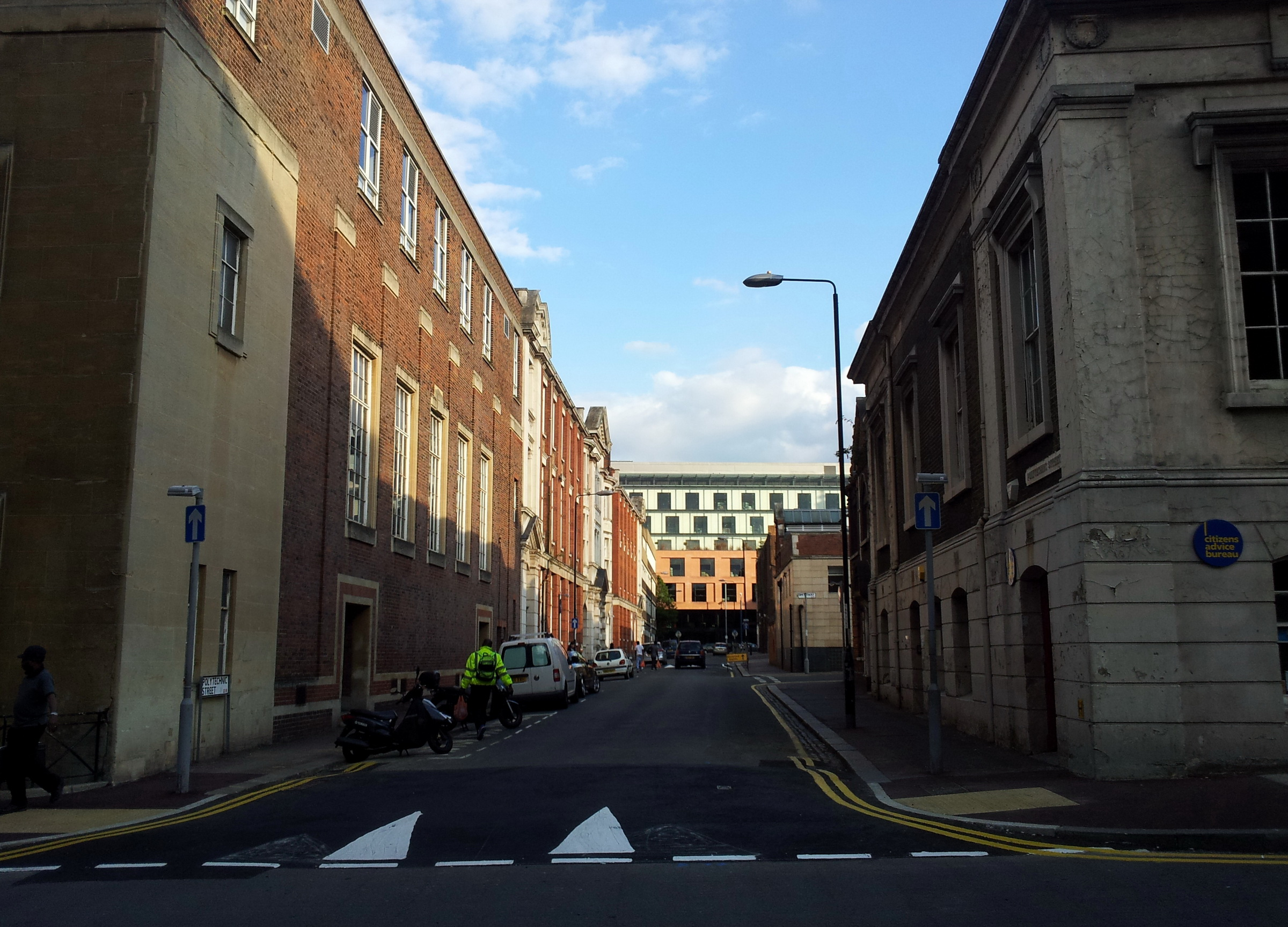
View from Calderwood Street

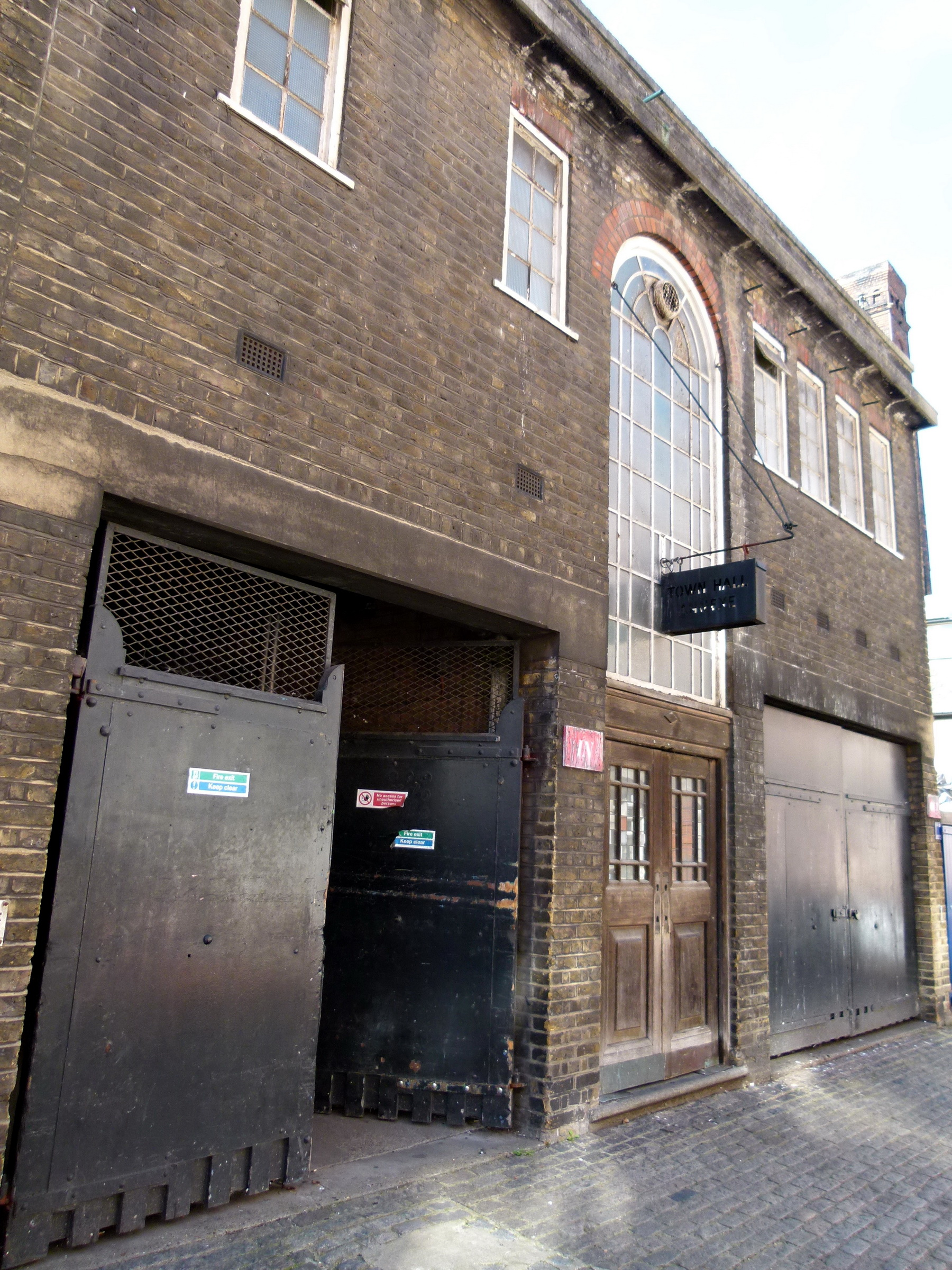
Town Hall annex building

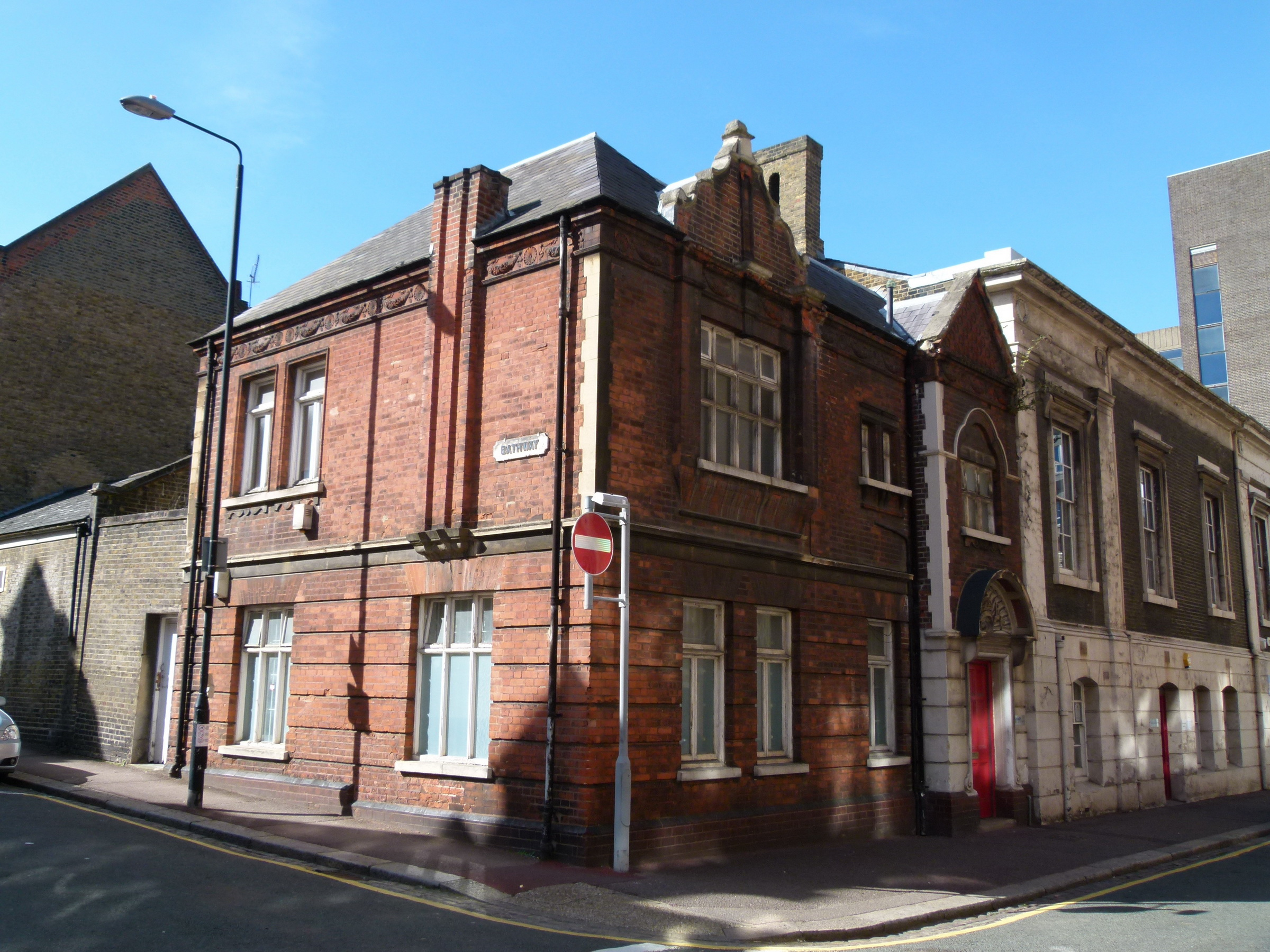
Old county court building

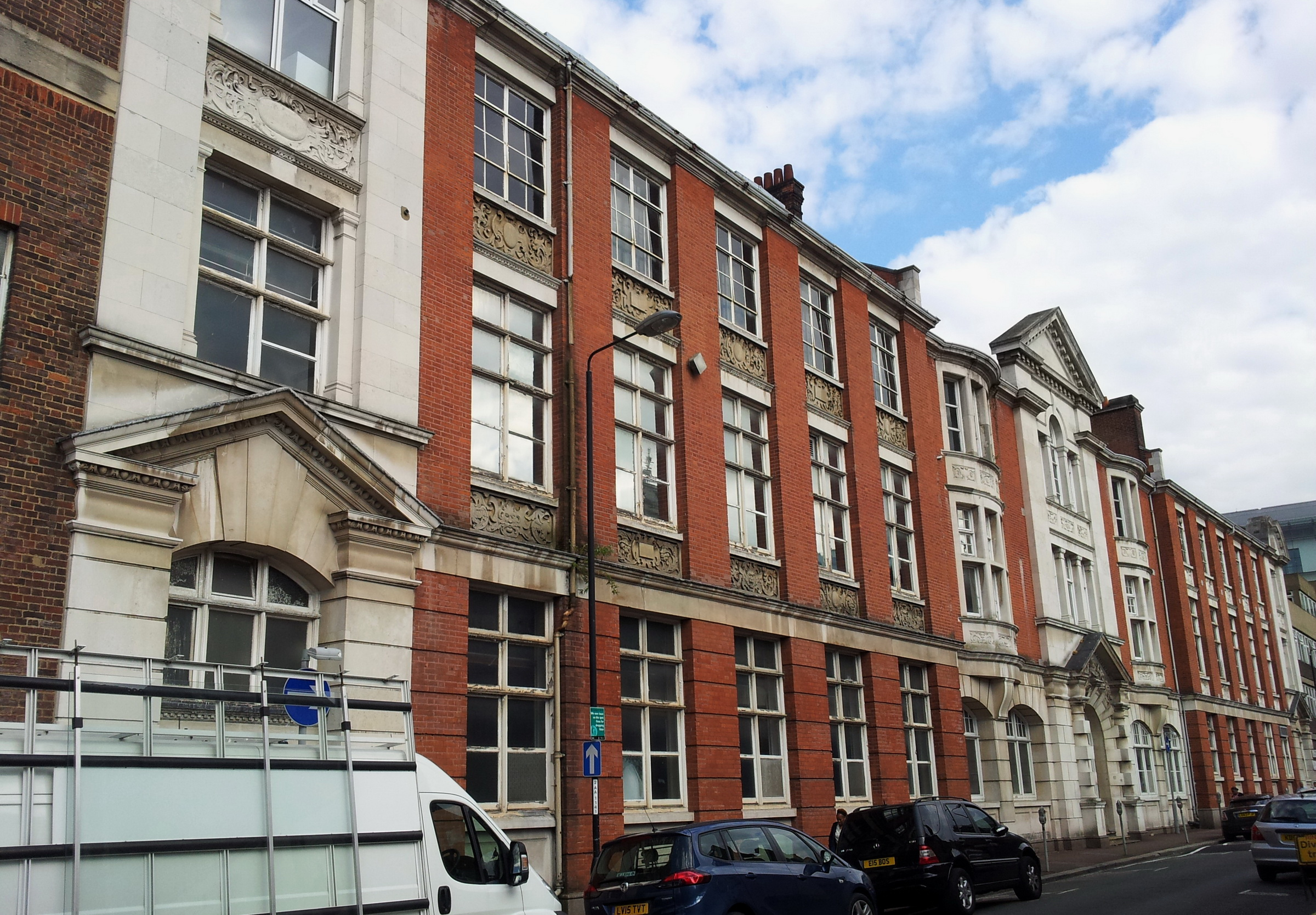
Art and Science School

=== Thomas Street ===
On the corner of Wellington Street stands the former London and Provincial Bank, now a bookmaker's shop (H. H. Church, 1891–92). The Earl of Chatham public house was begun around 1805 by the Powis brothers, who were brewers themselves, but rebuilt in 1898, probably after a design by Church. Adjacent to it is another Brutalist extension of the Woolwich Polytechnic (various architects, led by George Trevett, 1963–64), then two 1930s school buildings (J. H. Anderson, 1937, and Figgis & Munby, 1931), and on the corner of Calderwood Street the Rotunda building. This building was designed by T.P. Figgis and A. E. Munby. The grand building in Portland stone with a full-height circular hall lit by a domical lantern, was ceremonially opened in June 1917, in the middle of war. In the Island Site plans the 1960s building and the one from 1937 will be replaced by new commercial and residential buildings; the other buildings will be restored with the exception of the Earl of Chatham, which is the only building not owned by the Powis Street Estate.

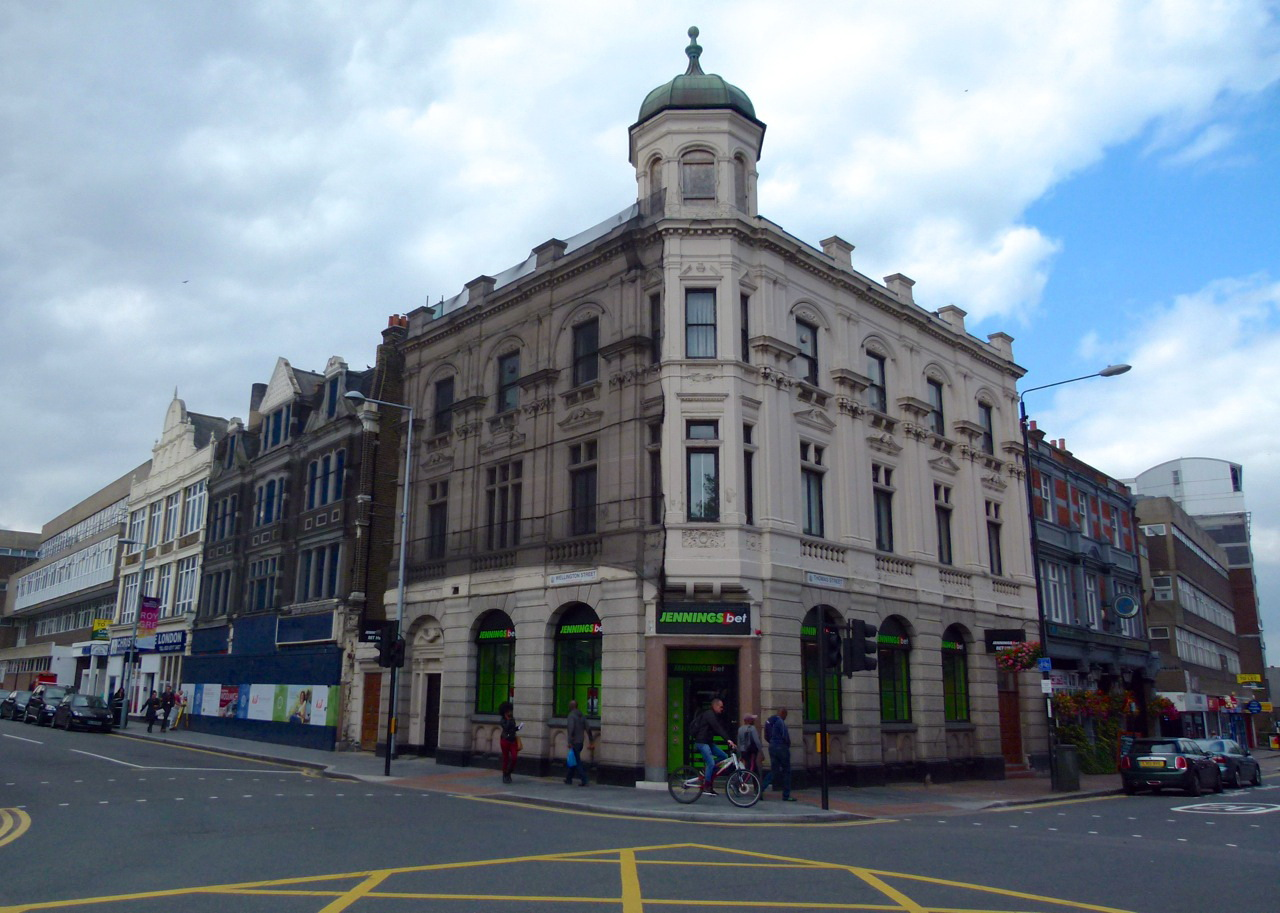
Former bank, now Jennings

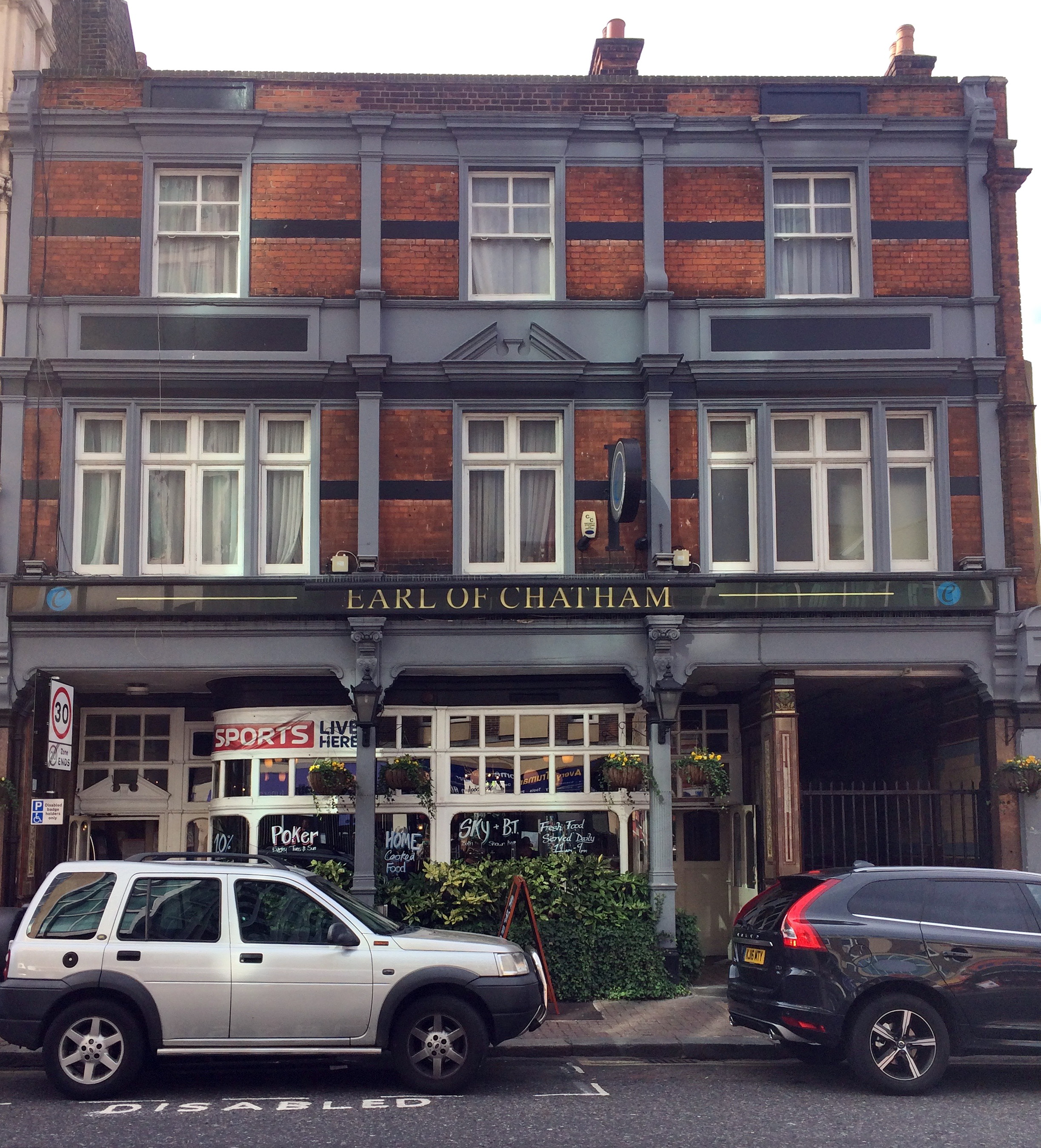
Earl of Chatham pub

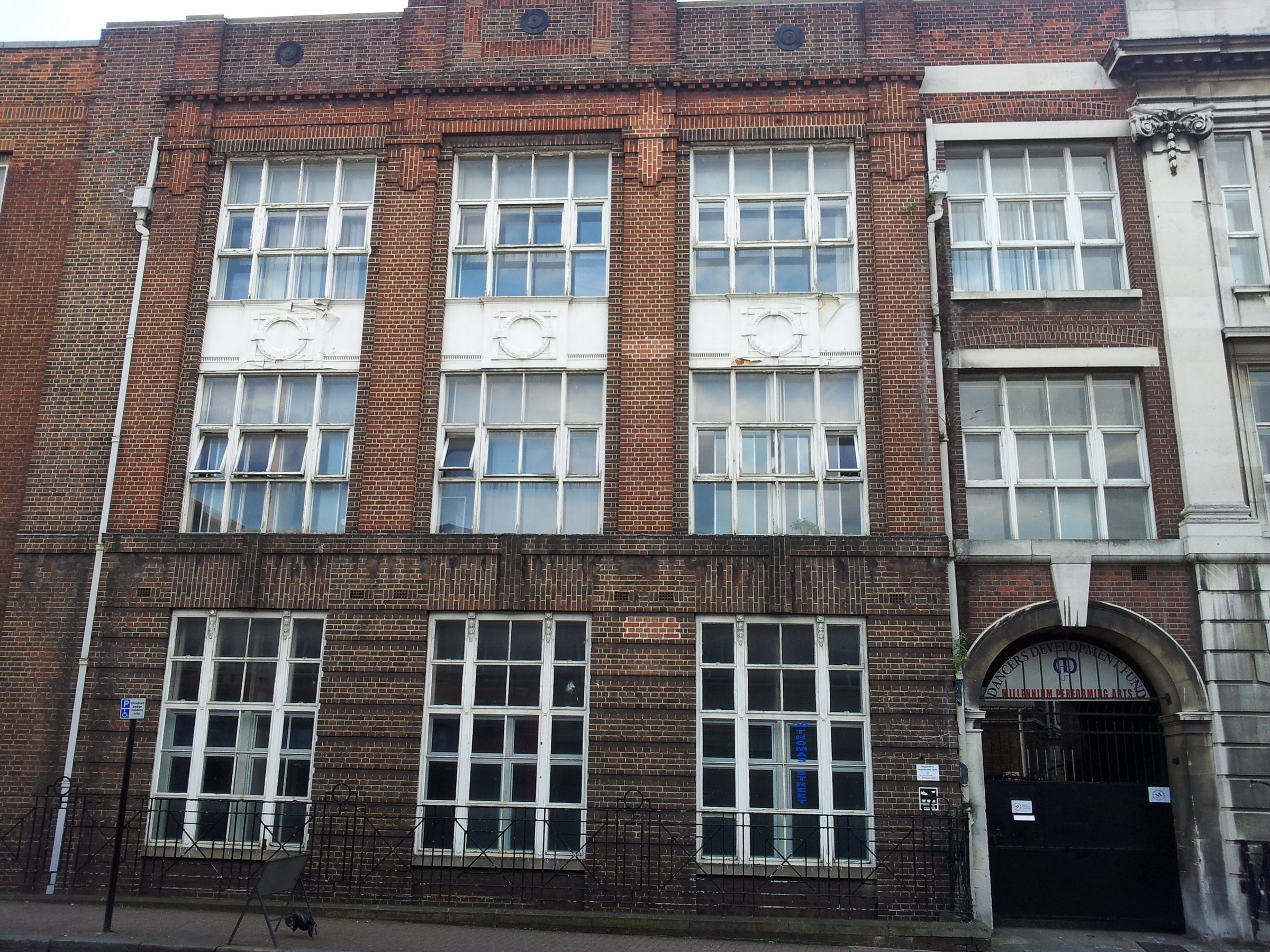
Polytechnic building

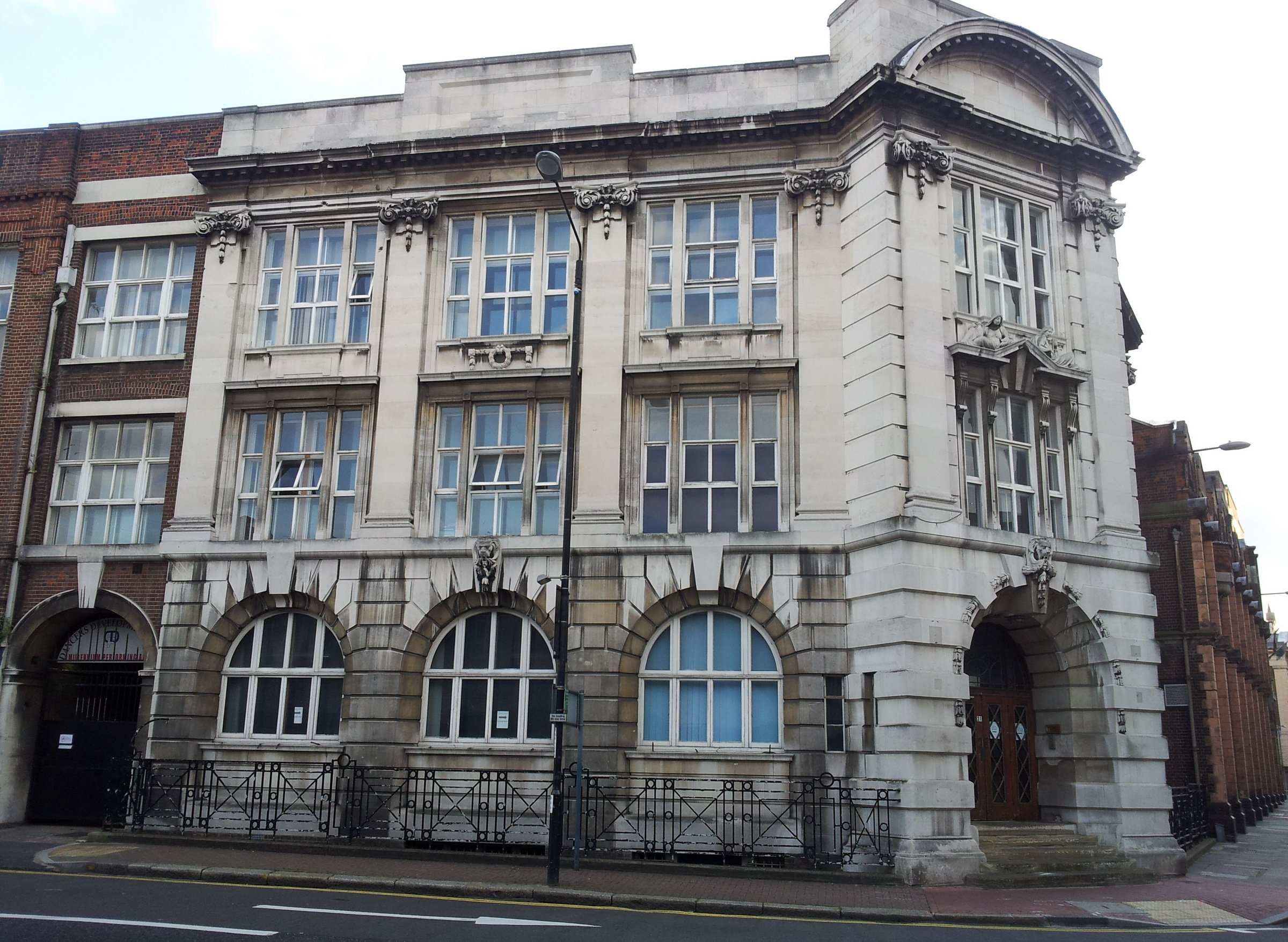
Rotunda Building

== See also ==
- Woolwich Town Hall
- Gurdwara Sahib Woolwich - listed former Methodist church in Calderwood Street
- St Peter's Roman Catholic Church, Woolwich - nearby listed church
- Beresford Square
- Powis Street
- Old Woolwich
