= Gurdwara Sahib Woolwich =

Gurdwara in Greenwich, London

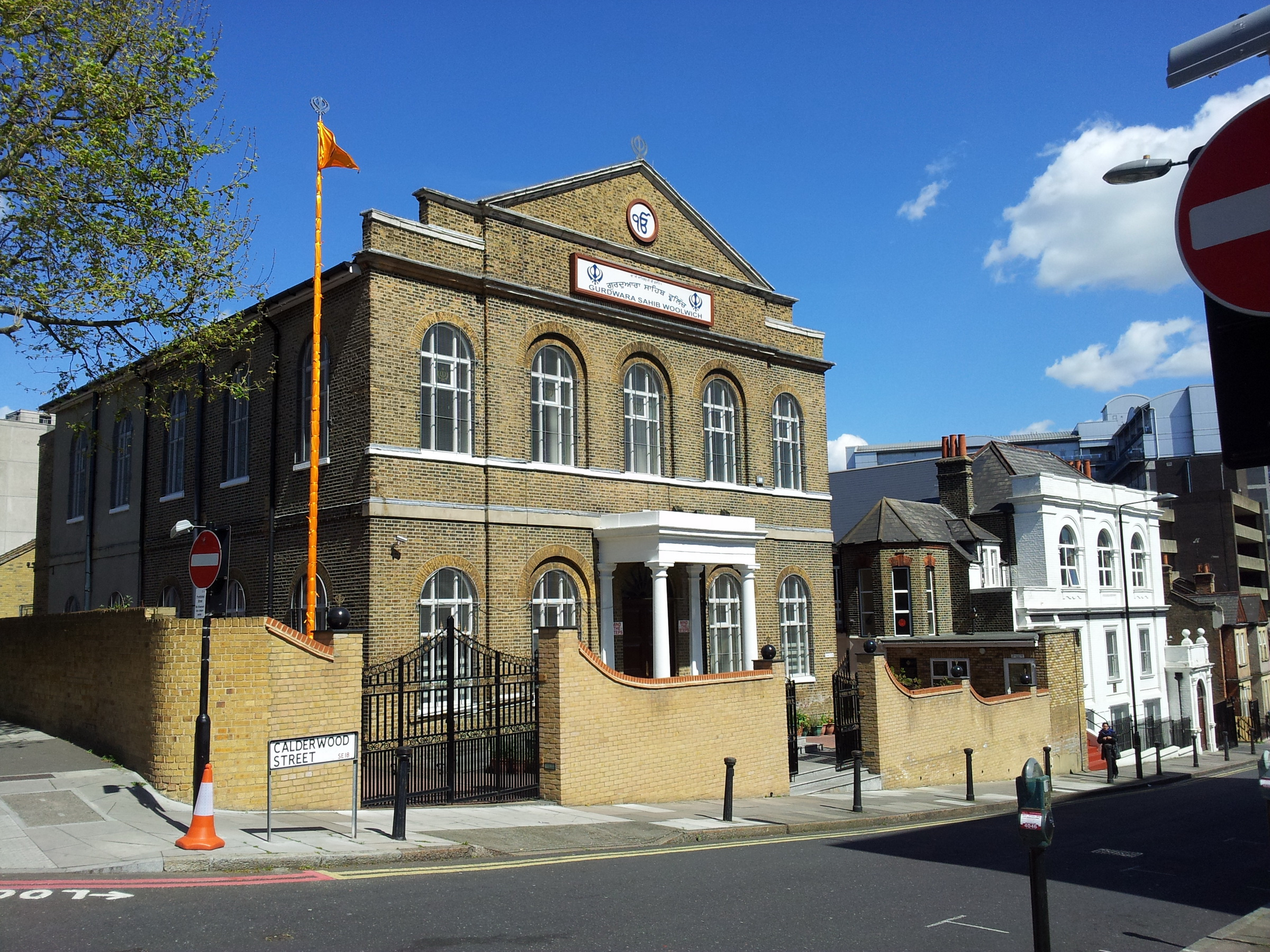
- Gurdwara and langar (white façade)

Religion
- Affiliation: Sikhism
- Ecclesiastical or organizational status: Greenwich Sikh Association

Location
- Location: Woolwich; London, SE18; United Kingdom
- Interactive map of Gurdwara Sahib Woolwich
- Coordinates: 51.490412°N 0.062669°E

Architecture
- Type: Wesleyan chapel (cf Wesley's Chapel)
- Style: Georgian architecture
- Completed: 1816
- Construction cost: £4,594
- Capacity: 850 (in 1816)

Website
- woolwichgurdwara.org.uk

The Gurdwara Sahib Woolwich is a Sikh gurdwara in central Woolwich in the Royal Borough of Greenwich, South East London. It was built in 1814–16 as a Methodist church and converted into a Sikh place of worship in the late 1970s. The main hall is Grade II-listed; the former Soldier's Institute and Sunday School next door, now in use as a langar hall, is not.

== Location ==
The gurdwara and langar are situated on an irregular quadrilateral plot of about 1500 m^{2} (0.37 acre) on the corner of Calderwood Street and John Wilson Street (part of the A205 or South Circular Road). The plot is at the north side of Calderwood Street, which at this point slopes down towards the east. This street was called William Street at the time when the Methodist church was built. It was renamed Calderwood Street in 1938, after a local industrialist and Woolwich Polytechnic chairman. The south-eastern section of Calderwood Street is part of Bathway Quarter, a designated conservation area; the gurdwara and langar are not.

== History ==
=== Methodist church ===
The first Wesleyan Methodist congregation in Woolwich was established in 1789 by a carpenter at the Warren, Thomas Murrell. A chapel was built on Woolwich New Road, a site that is now occupied by the east end of Equitable House. As this chapel was soon outgrown, in 1812 a plot on the north-west side of William Street (now Calderwood Street) was leased from the Powis Estate. Building started in 1814 and the church was completed two years later at a cost of £4,594. In 1817 a Sunday school for 400 children was built immediately to the east of the chapel. This building was replaced in 1889–90 by the current building designed by Walter Whincop, after a legacy was left by a former Sunday school superintendent. The new building would also house the Soldiers' Institute, the Methodist church being an official garrison chapel for nonconformists.

=== Sikh gurdwara ===
The Soldiers' Institute closed after the Second World War and church attendance dwindled to around fifteen in 1977. A redevelopment scheme for the site was blocked by Greenwich Council after the chapel was listed in 1973. In 1977 the two buildings were put up for sale and shortly afterwards acquired by the local Sikh community to be converted into a gurdwara, which has been its function ever since. During the harvest festival (Visakhi), thousands of Sikhs march in procession (Nagar Kirtan) through Woolwich, starting at the Gurdwara Ramgarhia in Masons Hill and finishing at the Gurdwara Sahib in Calderwood Street.

== The buildings ==
The Woolwich Sahib Gurdwara consists of two buildings: the former Wesleyan church hall of 1816, now a gurdwara, and the former Soldier's Institute and Sunday School of 1890, now in use as a langar. The site is partly surrounded by a brick wall with fences, some of which are decorated with Sikh symbols. On the south-west corner of the premises a tall, ornamented flagpole has been placed with a Nishan Sahib, the Sikh triangular flag.

=== The main building ===
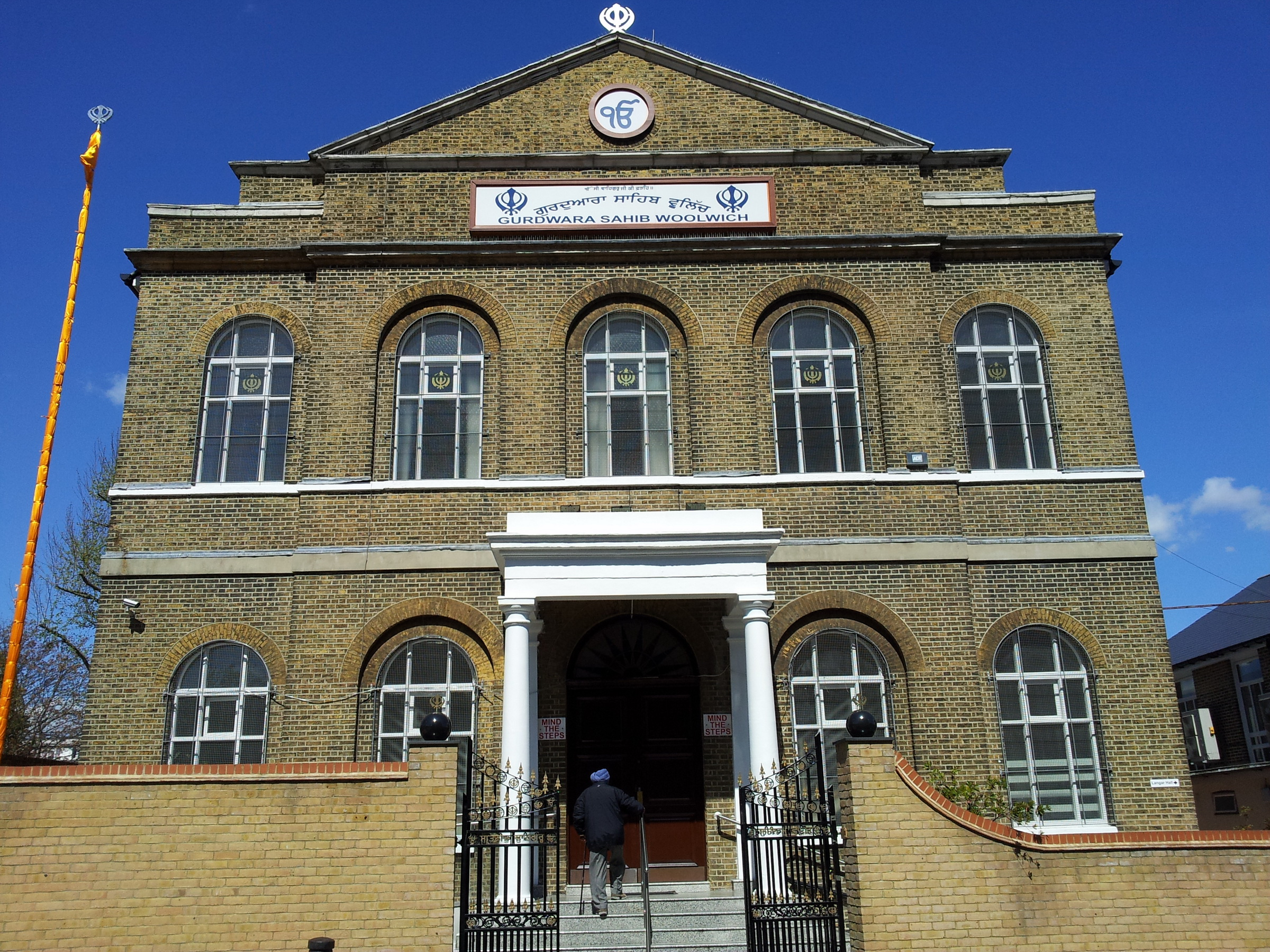
Main hall from the south

The main church hall was finished in 1816 and is a Grade II-listed building since 1973 (English Heritage Building ID: 200246). The architect is not known, although it is likely to have been designed by the Rev. William Jenkins, who is responsible for at least eleven Methodist chapels in the early 1800s, all clearly inspired by Wesley's Chapel of 1778 in City Road. The Woolwich chapel was an enlarged version of the Wesleyan chapel in Rochester, Kent, a Jenkins design. It measures 16 by 22 m (52x71 ft). The Wellington Street façade has five bays and two floors with nine round-headed windows. The centrally placed main entrance is accentuated by a prostyle portico. The three central bays project slightly and are crowned by a pediment. On the parapet below the pediment a stone plaque with the inscription The Methodist Chapel, 1816 is now covered up by a wooden sign with the text ਗੁਰਦੁਆਰਾ ਸਾਹਿਬ ਵੂਲਿਚ - Gurdwara Sahib Woolwich. The west and east walls are plain brick with ten windows each. At the north end of the building is a small apse and the former vestry.

The plainness of the interior of this type of Methodist chapel with its flat ceiling has been described as barn-like. In the main seating on the ground floor rows of pews faced the pulpit. Additional seating areas were created on the galleries situated around a large oval opening through which the pulpit could be seen. Unusual in a Methodist church of this type is the presence of burial vaults underneath, "in case another Death should happen in the Preacher's family". The two main floors of the building are currently used as Darbar Sahib Halls, the lower and upper prayer hall, containing the Guru Granth Sahib, the holy scriptures. The main alterations for Sikh worship have been the removal of the pews and the insertion of a fixed floor where the galleries had been.

=== The annex building ===
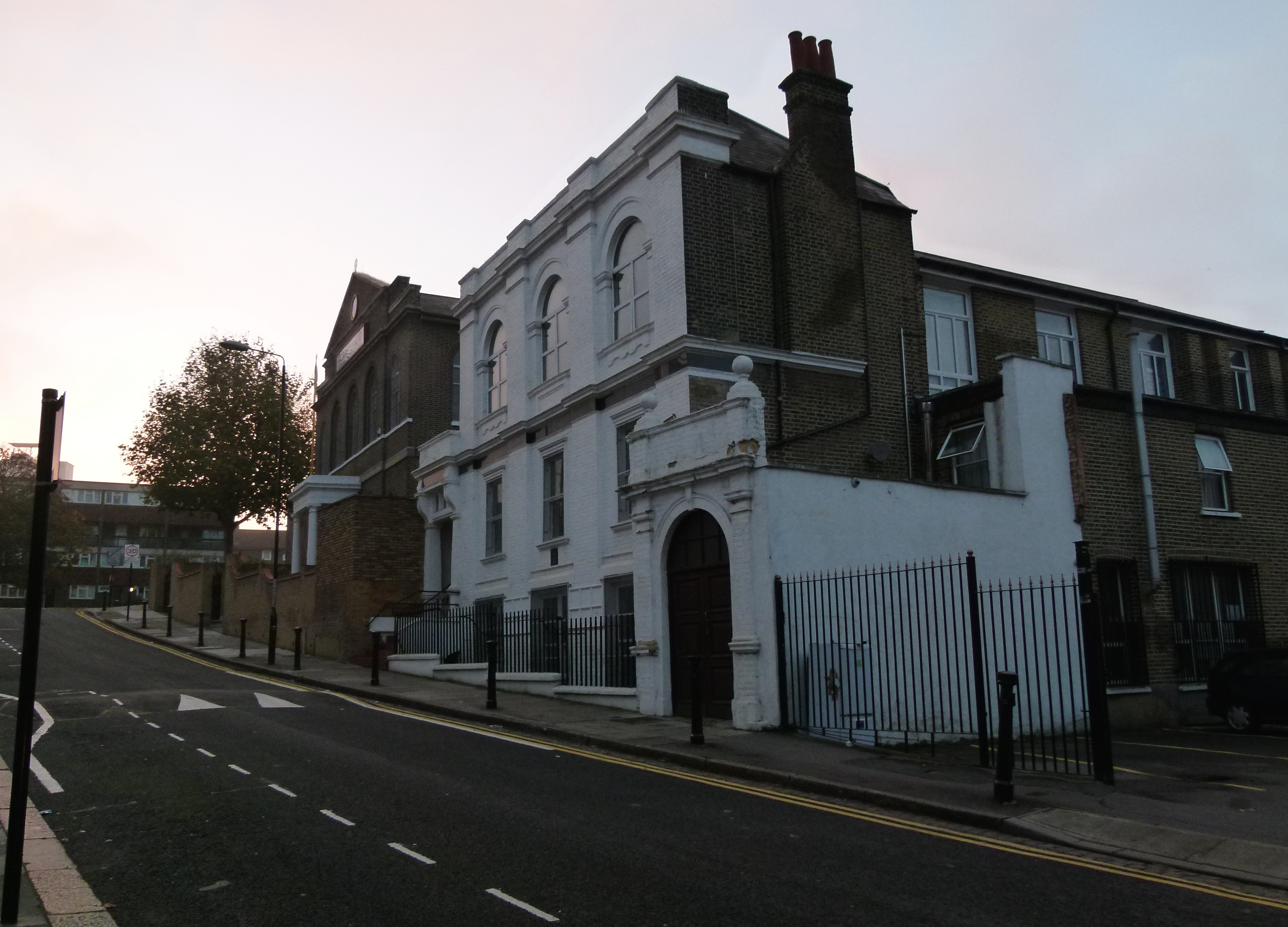
Annex building from the south east

The annex building was built in 1889–90 after a design by local architect Walter Whincop. It is described in Volume 44 of the Survey of London as "the last of a locally distinctive type to survive in Woolwich". Unlike the adjacent church hall it is not a listed building. The main façade on Calderwood Street, now painted white, consists of three bays and three storeys (including the basement). It is flanked by two single-storey porches. The western entrance was for the children attending Sunday school, the eastern entrance was for the soldiers. The original west doors were replaced by ornamental doors of wood and bronze made in Rajasthan. In the basement were baths and a café for the military men, on the ground floor their reading room and a meeting room, on the top floor was the Sunday school. The building's main use currently is that of a langar hall (a communal refectory serving vegetarian food) with a kitchen. On the top floor are meeting rooms, a library, Granthi quarters and offices. The basement is used for various functions and serves as a Saturday school for pupils 5–18 years old, the Guru Nanak Khalsa School Greenwich.

== See also ==
- Sikhism in England
- List of gurdwaras in the United Kingdom
- Bathway Quarter
