= Alan Noel Latimer Munby =

English author

Alan Noel Latimer Munby (25 December 1913 – 26 December 1974) was an English librarian, bibliographical scholar and book collector. He is also remembered as the author of a volume of ghost stories written in the tradition of M. R. James.

== Early life ==
Born in Hampstead, Munby was the only son of the architect Alan E. Munby and his wife Ethel Greenhill. He was educated at Clifton College and King's College, Cambridge. At some point he acquired the nickname "Tim" (from the second syllable of his third name), by which he was known throughout his life.

== Career ==
Munby worked in the antiquarian book trade with Bernard Quaritch Ltd. (1935–1937) and Sotheby & Company (1937–1939, 1945–1947). During the Second World War, he was commissioned into the British Army but for several years was a prisoner of war.

In 1947, he became Librarian of King's College, Cambridge and in 1948 was elected as a fellow.

He was elected to the Roxburghe Club in 1957.

He was Lyell Lecturer in Bibliography at the University of Oxford for 1962–1963. He held the Sandars Readership in Bibliography, University of Cambridge in 1969–1970.

Munby was a co-founder in 1949 of the Cambridge Bibliographical Society. He was elected President of the Bibliographical Society in 1974 and died during his term of office.

His scholarly publications include a five-volume study of the eccentric nineteenth-century book collector Sir Thomas Phillipps (1951–1960); a twelve-volume series of Sale Catalogues of Libraries of Eminent Persons (1971–1975); and a posthumously published union list of British Book Sale Catalogues, 1676–1800 (1977), compiled with Lenore Coral.

=== Ghost stories ===
Munby is also remembered for a slim volume of ghost stories, The Alabaster Hand, which includes three tales written in Oflag VII-B, a German prisoner-of-war camp near Eichstätt, Bavaria. These stories – "The Topley Place Sale", "The Four Poster" and "The White Sack" – featured in a prison-camp magazine, Touchstone, edited by Elliott Viney. A limited edition of one story was printed on a printing press owned by the Bishop of Eichstätt, Michael Rackl.

Anthony Boucher and J. Francis McComas praised the stories in The Alabaster Hand as "quietly terrifying modernizations of the M. R. James tradition".

== Personal life ==
Munby's first marriage, soon after the outbreak of war in 1939, was to Joan Margaret Edelsten. When he was able to return to England in 1945, he was shocked to learn that she had just died. He married secondly Sheila Crowther-Smith, a long-standing family friend, and they had a son, Giles Munby.

== Works ==
=== Books ===
- (ed.) Letters to Leigh Hunt from his son Vincent (Cloanthus Press, 1934)
- (with Desmond Flower) English Poetical Autographs (Cassell, 1938)
- "Some Caricatures of Book-Collectors – An Essay" (printed for private circulation by William H. Robinson Ltd, Christmas 1948)
- The Alabaster Hand and other Ghost Stories (Dobson, 1949) Stories included: Herodes Redivivus, The Inscription, The Alabaster Hand, The Topley Place Sale, The Tudor Chimney, A Christmas Game, The White Sack, The Four-Poster, The Negro's Head, The Tregannet Book of Hours, An Encounter in the Mist, The Lectern, Number Seventy-Nine, The Devil's Autograph.
- Phillips Studies, 5 vols. (Cambridge University Press, 1951–1960)
- The Cult of the Autograph Letter in England (London: Athlone Press, 1962)
- (ed.) Sale Catalogues of Libraries of Eminent Persons, 12 vols. (London: Mansell, 1971–1975)
- Connoisseurs and Medieval Miniatures 1750–1850 (Oxford: Clarendon Press, 1972)
- Essays and Papers (ed. Nicolas Barker) (Scolar Press, 1977) ISBN 0-85967-349-9
- (ed.; with Lenore Coral) British Book Sale Catalogues, 1676–1800 (London: Mansell, 1977) ISBN 9780720107036

=== Short stories ===
- "The Four-Poster". Touchstone, December 1944. Collected in The Alabaster Hand (1949).
- "The White Sack". Touchstone, January 1945. Collected in The Alabaster Hand (1949).
- "The Topley Place Sale". Touchstone, March 1945. Collected in The Alabaster Hand (1949).
- "The Inscription". Chambers's Journal, date unknown. Collected in The Alabaster Hand (1949).
- "The Devil’s Autograph". Cambridge Review, date unknown. Collected in The Alabaster Hand (1949).

== Legacy ==
Munby built up a major collection of the works of Thomas Babington Macaulay, which he donated during his lifetime to Trinity College, Cambridge. He also accumulated a working collection of 7000–8000 volumes of early bibliography, sale catalogues, and material relating to libraries, the book trade, and connoisseurship, including many rarities: part of this collection (approximately 1800 volumes) was acquired after his death by Cambridge University Library.

Following his death, a Munby Fellowship in Bibliography was established in Cambridge University Library in his memory, with money subscribed by his friends.

The reading room for rare books in Cambridge University Library is named the Munby Rare Books Reading Room in his memory.

Munby's correspondence with W. S. Lewis of the Lewis Walpole Library is held at that library.

Munby's career was celebrated in 2015 in Great Collectors and Their Grand Designs: A Centenary Celebration of the Life and Work of A. N. L. Munby.

== See also ==
- Lionel Keir Robinson
