= Alan E. Munby =

Alan Edward Munby FRIBA (16 January 1870 – 19 January 1938) was a British schoolmaster, architect, author, and lecturer, a Fellow of the Royal Institute of British Architects.

== Early life ==
Munby was born in Pendleton, Lancashire, in 1870, the son of F. J. Munby, a solicitor in York. He was educated at Repton School and the University of Durham, where he became a lecturer in chemistry. He also carried out research at Cambridge and Heidelberg, then began a career as a schoolmaster, teaching sciences at Felstead School from 1895. However, he decided to pursue a different profession. From 1902 to 1905 he was articled to the architect Thomas Phillips Figgis (1858–1948) and also studied at the Architectural Association School of Architecture and the Trades Training School.

== Career ==
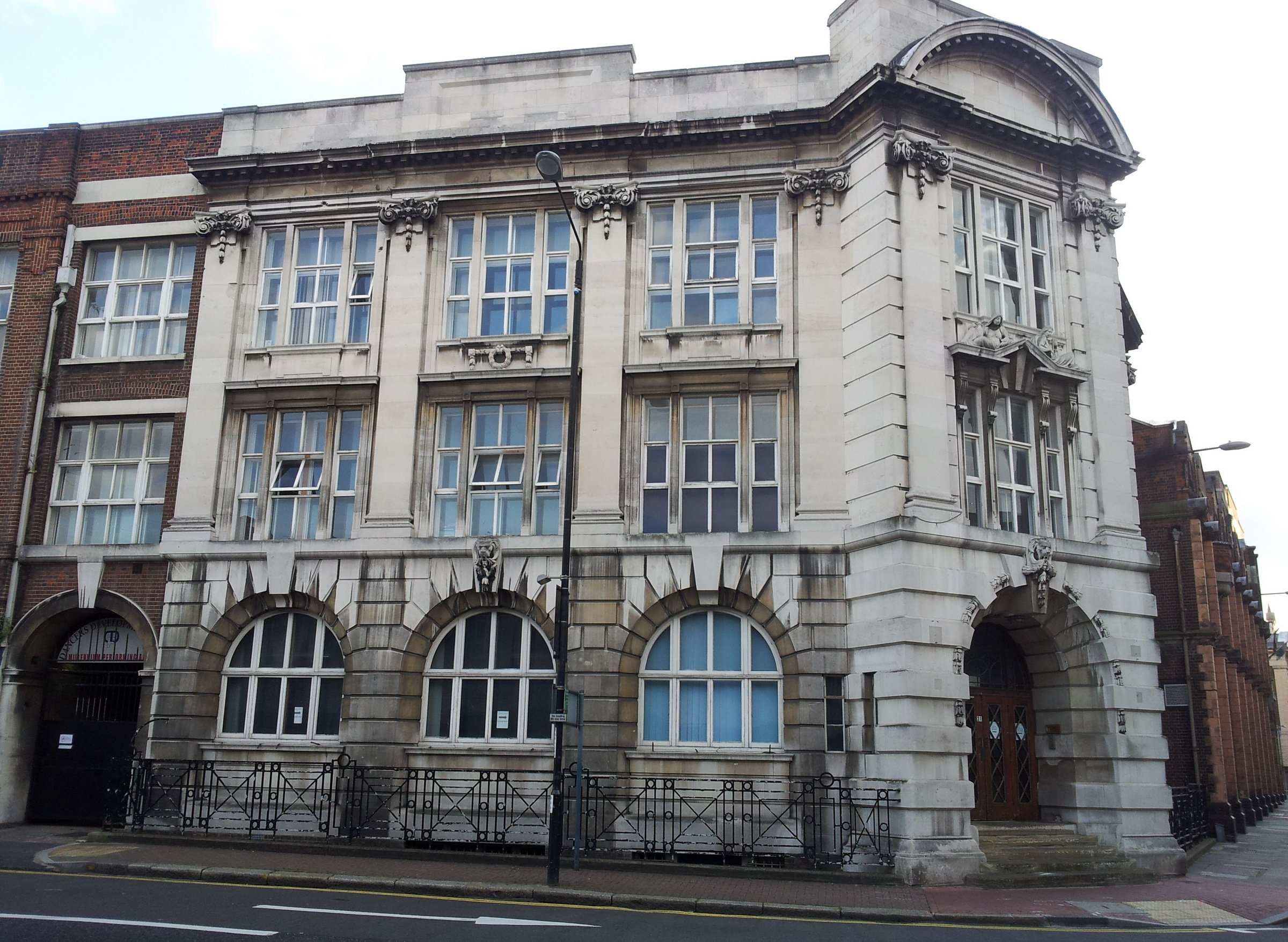
Rotunda Building, Woolwich, by Figgis and Munby

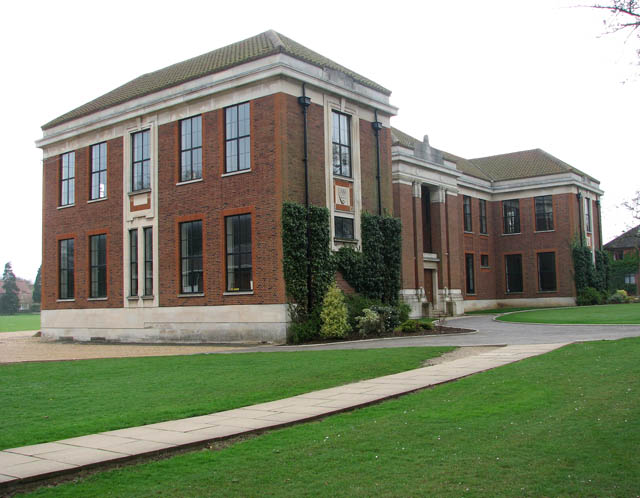
Library at Gresham's School, by Munby

In 1905 Munby established his own practice as an architect at 28 Martins Lane, Cannon Street, in the City of London, a year before passing his qualifying examination. He spent a year as an assistant to Alfred Cross (1858–1932) before returning to his own practice at 46 New Bond Street, Mayfair. In 1907 he was elected an Associate of the Royal Institute of British Architects and in 1912 a Fellow. His offices were at 9, Old Square, Lincoln's Inn, from 1912. He also lectured on the chemistry of materials and was the author of scientific books and papers. His Introduction to the Chemistry and Physics of Building Materials (1908) runs to 365 pages and was favourably reviewed.

As an architect, Munby specialized in school, university, and hospital buildings, but also carried out some domestic work and alterations.

For more than thirty years Munby was a member of the Science Standing Committee of the Royal Institute of British Architects, of which he became chairman, and he was a strong advocate for better science teaching, for its educational value.

Munby designed Science Laboratories for University College, Bangor, shortly before the First World War broke out in 1914, but they were not built until after it had ended. The Rotunda in Woolwich, designed with T. P. Figgis, a grand building in Portland stone with a high circular hall lit by a lantern, was opened in June 1917, during the war. Munby's Library Building at Gresham's School was opened by Field Marshal Lord Milne in June 1931. Pevsner has called this "classical re-revival".

Munby's Mesnes Building at Wigan College, built for Wigan Grammar School in 1935–1937, was made a listed building in 1997, and his Memorial Building at Bangor was listed in 2008.

== Personal life ==
On 16 August 1910, at Holy Trinity Church, Rugby, Warwickshire, Munby married Ethel Annie Greenhill, the daughter of Alfred Greenhill of Rugby, a surveyor. They had one son, Alan Noel Latimer Munby, and one daughter.

Ethel Munby died at home, 9 Eldon Road, Hampstead, in February 1935. Munby died at the same address in January 1938.

== Notable buildings ==
- Rotunda Building, Thomas Street, Bathway Quarter, Woolwich (1917, with T. P. Figgis)
- Departments for Natural Science and Agriculture, University College, Bangor, 1923
- Memorial Building, Bangor, 1923
- East Surrey Hospital extensions, 1924
- Science School for Clifton College, 1926
- Science Building for Highgate School, 1926
- Science Buildings for Beaumont College, Dover College, Shrewsbury School, and Hereford Cathedral School
- Library for Gresham's School, 1931
- Eton Fives / Squash Court for Emmanuel College, Cambridge, 1932–1933
- Out-patients’ department, Paddington Green Children's Hospital, 1934 (demolished)
- Former Mesnes Building, Wigan College, 1935–1937

== Selected publications ==
- A. E. Munby, A course of simple experiments in magnetism & electricity (London: Macmillan, 1903)
- Alfred William Stephens Cross, Alan Edward Munby, Practical Notes for Architectural Draughtsmen (London: Technical Journals, 1907)
- A. E. Munby, Introduction to the Chemistry and Physics of Building Materials (London: A. Constable and Co., 1908)
- Alan E. Munby, Laboratories, Their Planning and Fittings (London: G. Bell & Sons, 1921), with introduction by Sir Arthur Everett Shipley
