= Royal Arsenal Gatehouse =

Gatehouse in Greenwich, London, England

- (Beresford Gate)
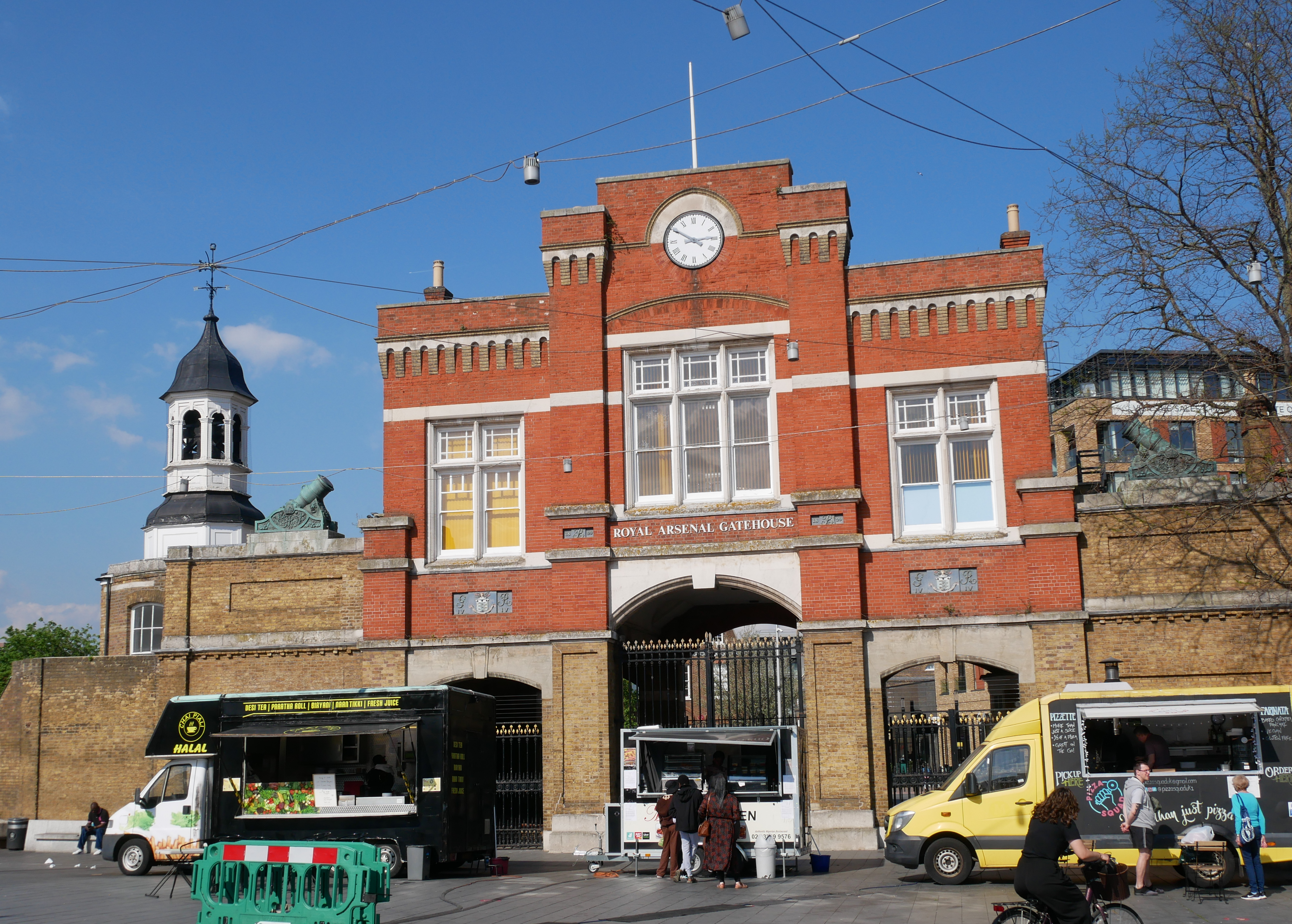
- Interactive map of Royal Arsenal Gatehouse
- Location: Beresford Square; Woolwich; London, SE18; United Kingdom
- Coordinates: 51.491111°N 0.069167°E
- Designer: John T. Jones
- Type: Grade II listed building
- Material: yellow and red stock brick, Portland stone
- Beginning date: 1828
- Completion date: 1891

The Royal Arsenal Gatehouse or Beresford Gate is the main gatehouse of the Royal Arsenal in Woolwich in the Royal Borough of Greenwich, South East London, England. It was built in 1828, enlarged several times and is now a Grade II-listed building. The gate was named after the Anglo-Irish general William Beresford, Master-General of the Ordnance and Governor of the Royal Military Academy in Woolwich.

== Location ==
The Royal Arsenal Gatehouse is situated in central Woolwich, between the town's main square, Beresford Square, and the Royal Arsenal, from which it is separated by a busy dual carriageway, Plumstead Road (A206). It is also situated close to the Woolwich Arsenal railway and DLR stations and the future Crossrail station.

== History ==
=== 19th century ===
The construction of a new gate for the Royal Arsenal was ordered in 1828 by the newly appointed Master-General of the Ordnance, William Carr Beresford, 1st Viscount Beresford (1768–1854). Its construction was supervised by Colonel John Thomas Jones, Chief Royal Engineer, who also made the design. The new gate replaced an older one of 1720 and was preceded by the clearance of some cottages which stood in the way of the main approach road to the Arsenal. Its appearance in the early 19th century was very different from its current state, as a mid-1830s lithograph shows. In 1859 an office with a bell tower above were added on the west side, and in 1889 the east side was extended too. Two years later, the original gate was built over to create three extra waiting rooms.

The wall along Plumstead Road was built around 1778 and then raised to about 6 m height and extended further east in 1804. It was probably built by penal labour, the convicts being housed in prison hulks moored in the Thames. An extra gate, Middle Gate, was added in 1830 and renewed in 1843. A third one, Third Gate, followed in 1856 but has not survived.

=== 20th and 21st century ===
In 1969 plans were presented by the Greater London Council (GLC) for the widening of Beresford Street and Plumstead Road, necessary because of traffic congestion and made more urgent by the massive construction scheme at Thamesmead. In the original plans, Beresford Gate was to be demolished, as were Holy Trinity Church and the Century Cinema in the northwest corner of Beresford Square. The plans were delayed and a possible reconstruction of the gatehouse further north was considered. In 1984–86 the road was led through a section of the Arsenal north of the gatehouse, which by that time had been listed. A new gate for the Arsenal was built further north in 1985–86, re-using twin stone piers with urns from the Paragon on the New Kent Road, built by Michael Searles in 1789–90, and rescued from there by the GLC in the 1960s when the road was widened. The old gatehouse in Beresford Square was restored by the new owner, Greenwich Council, in 1991–92, and again in 1995–96. The lodges were adapted for offices.

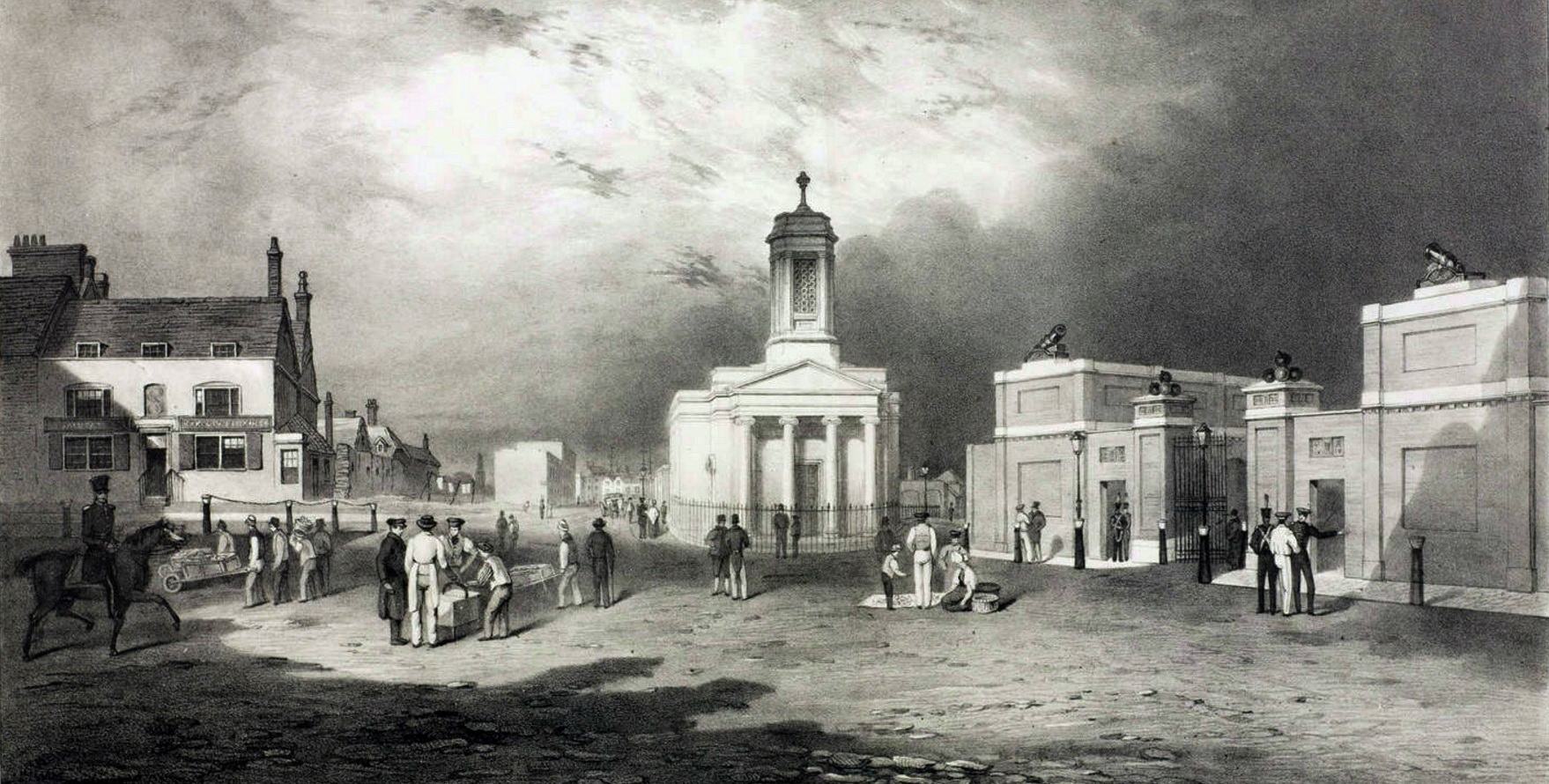
The original gate as it appeared around 1835

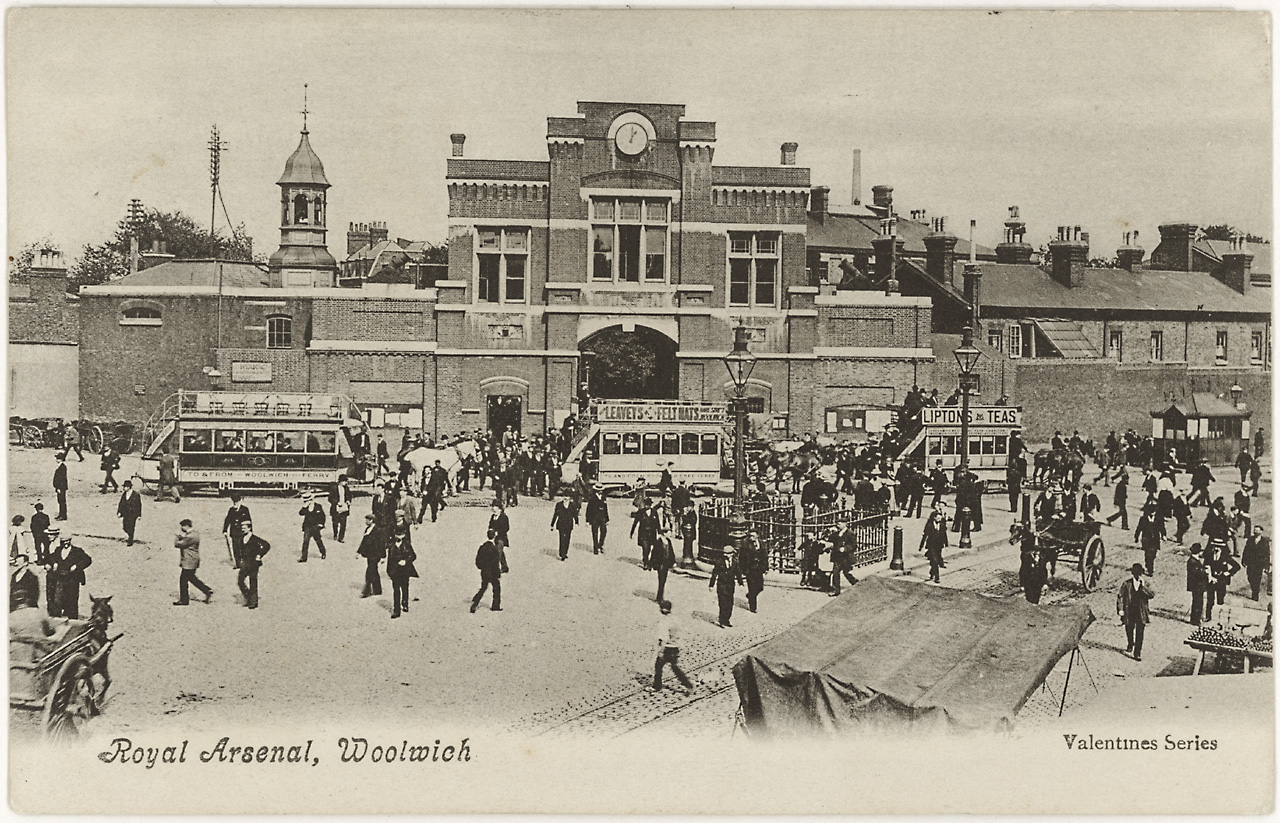
The completed gate in the early 20th century

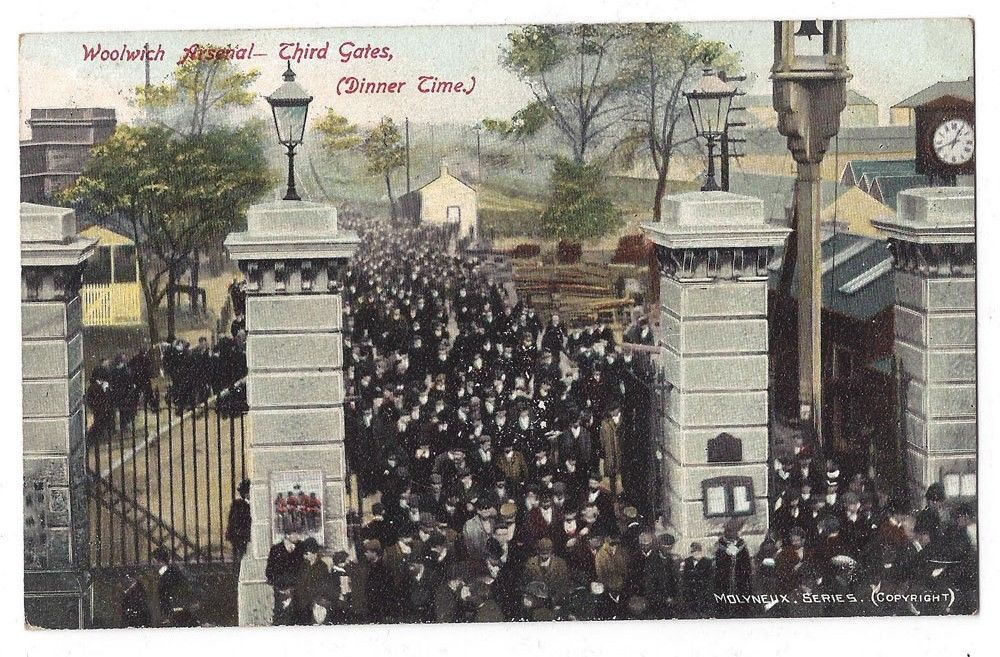
Arsenal workers at the "Third Gate", c. 1905

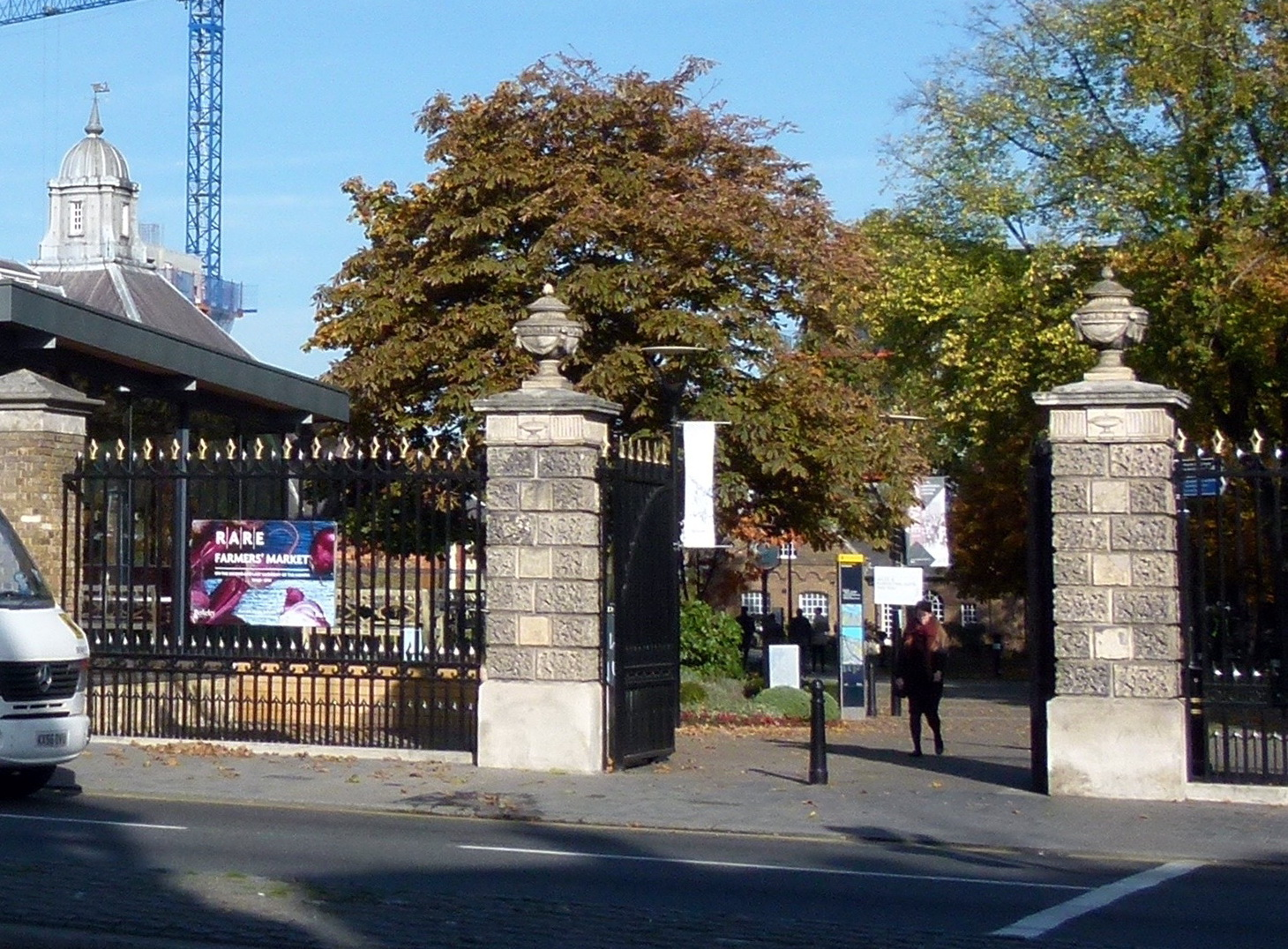
New main entrance, c. 1790, re-used in 1985

== Description ==
The construction of the Royal Arsenal Gatehouse, or Beresford Gate as it was originally called, took place in stages. The oldest parts (1828, 1859, 1889) are of plain yellow stock brick with some stone detailing. The last additions of 1891 are of red brick and feature three large windows on each side and a clock at the top of its south-facing gable. The central part has three openings, which are currently closed off by iron fences. The middle opening was always wider and was meant for horses and carriages; the flanking openings were for pedestrians. The latter were widened in 1936. The gate openings on the south side of the building correspond with those in the north side and lead into a covered plaza. The rooms above rest on metal beams with arched floors. The central section of the gate is flanked by two lodges from 1828, both adorned with recessed rectangular panels and surmounted by brass mortars. The western annexe of 1859 has a bell tower. The building features several plaques, inserted in the buttresses and below the windows. The inscriptions are "1829 B" and "G.R. IV"; one bears a shield with three guns. Two cattle drinking troughs of the Metropolitan Drinking Fountain and Cattle Trough Association from the 1890s and two modern stone benches have been placed on the south side of the building.

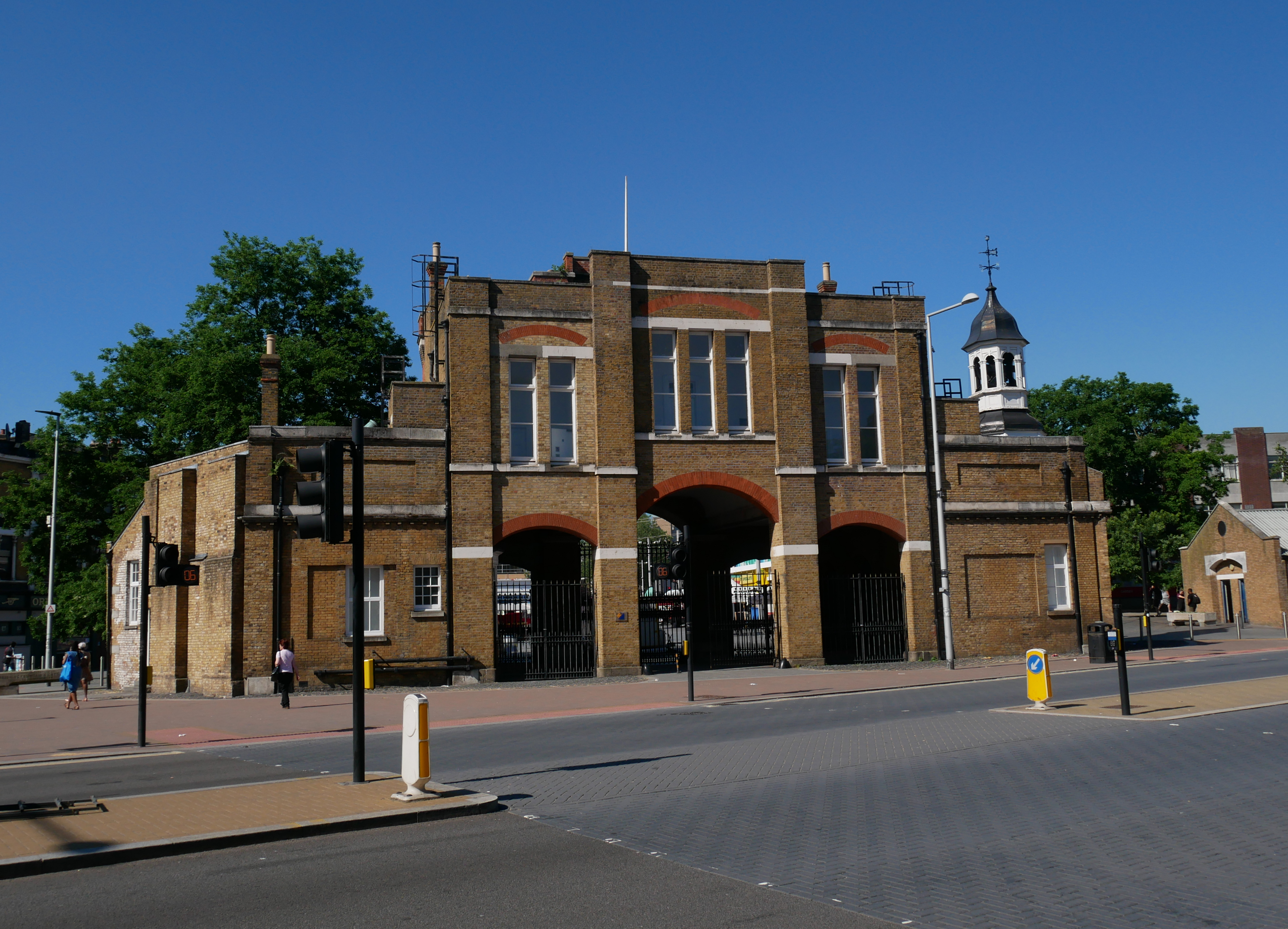
View from the north (Plumstead Road)

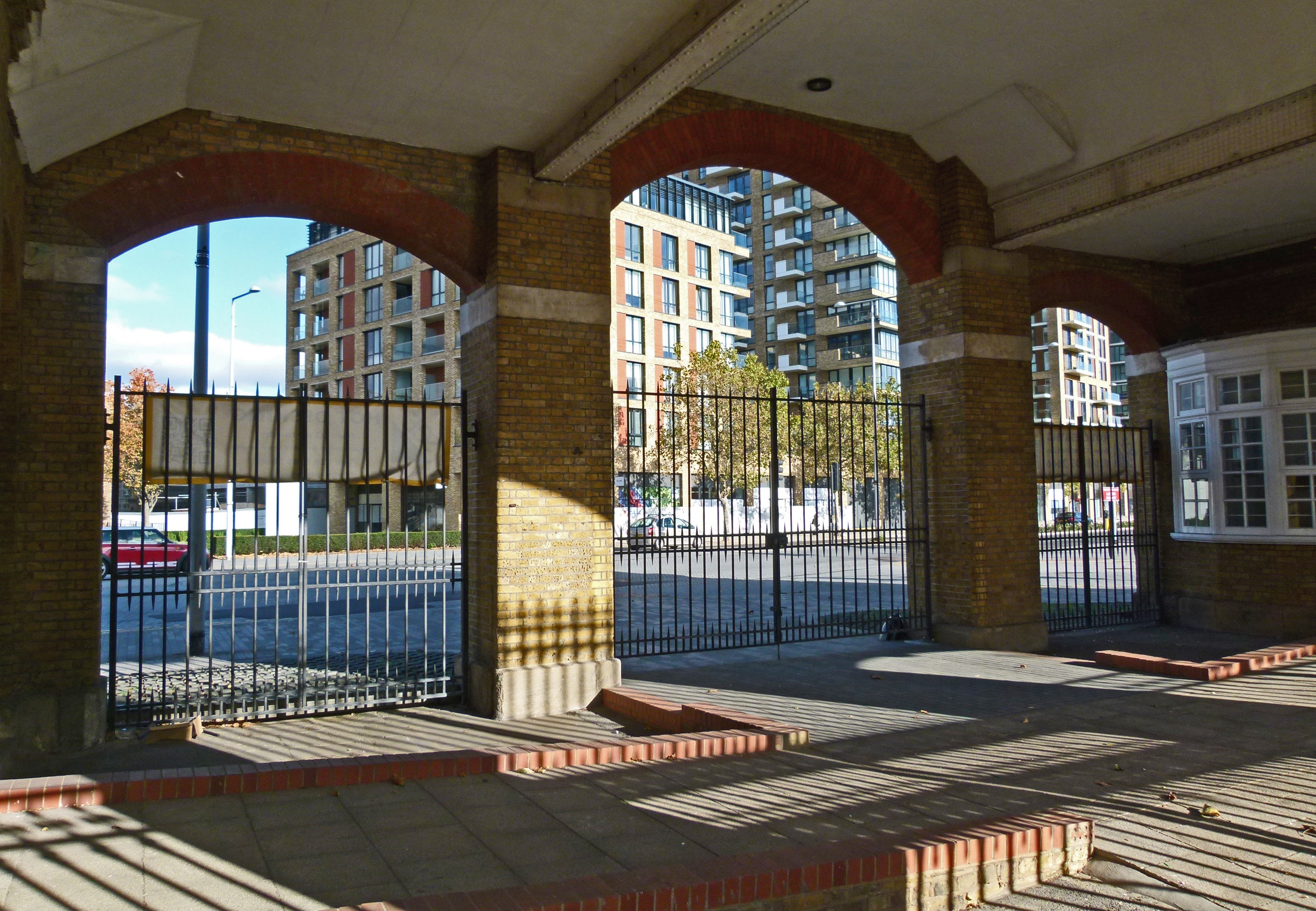
Closed-off passages and covered plaza

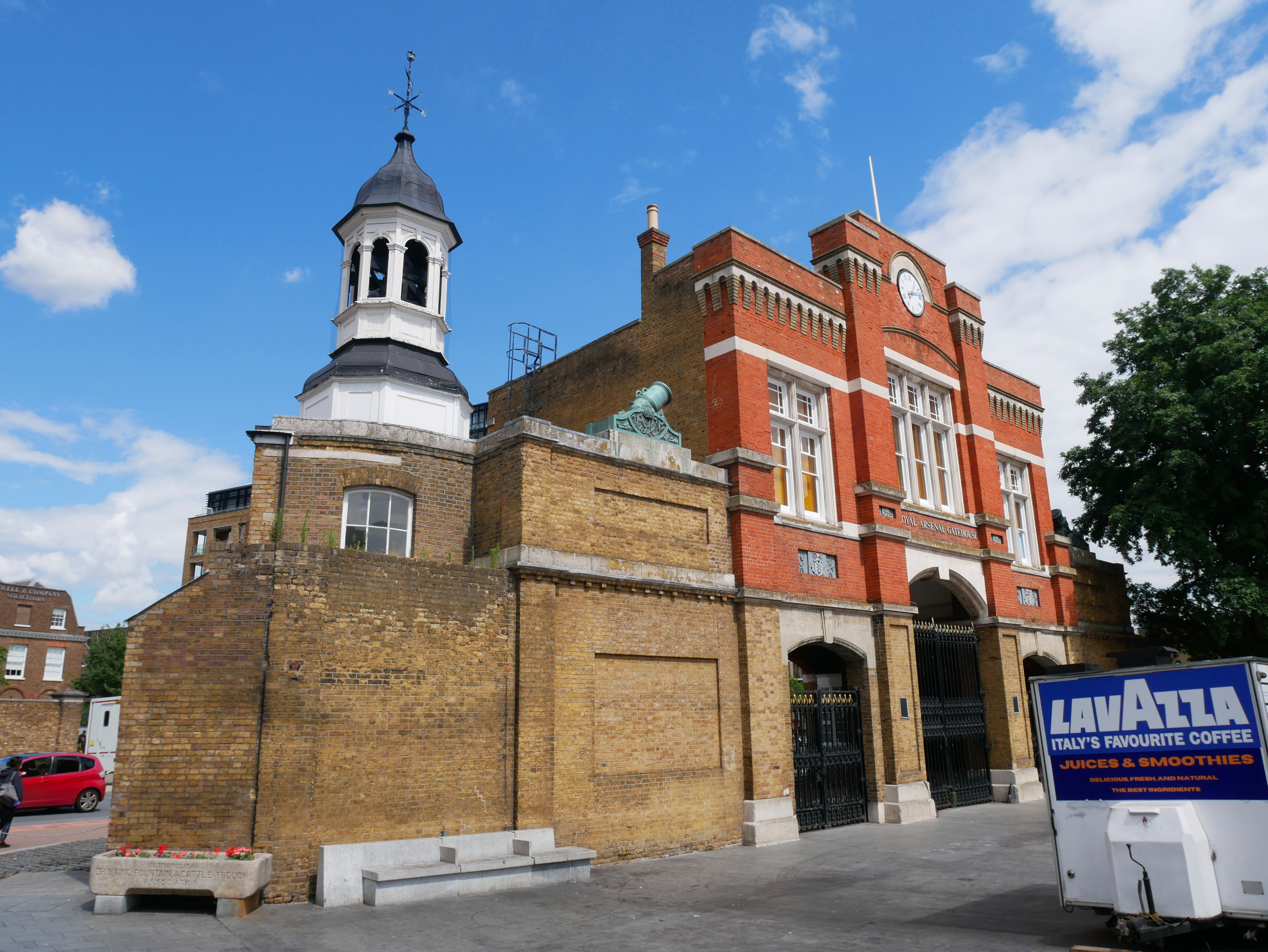
Southwest range and bell tower

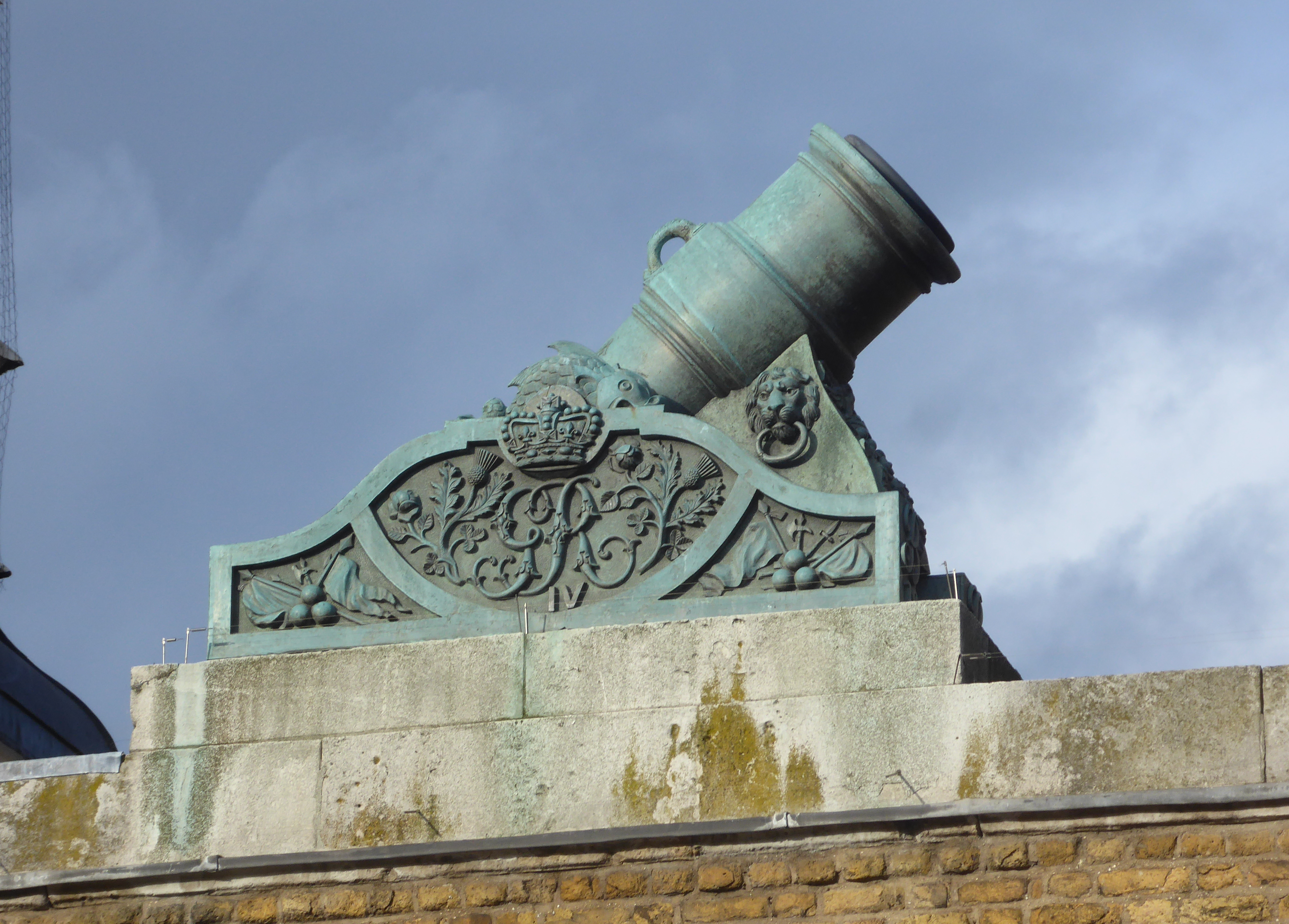
Mortar on top of west pavilion

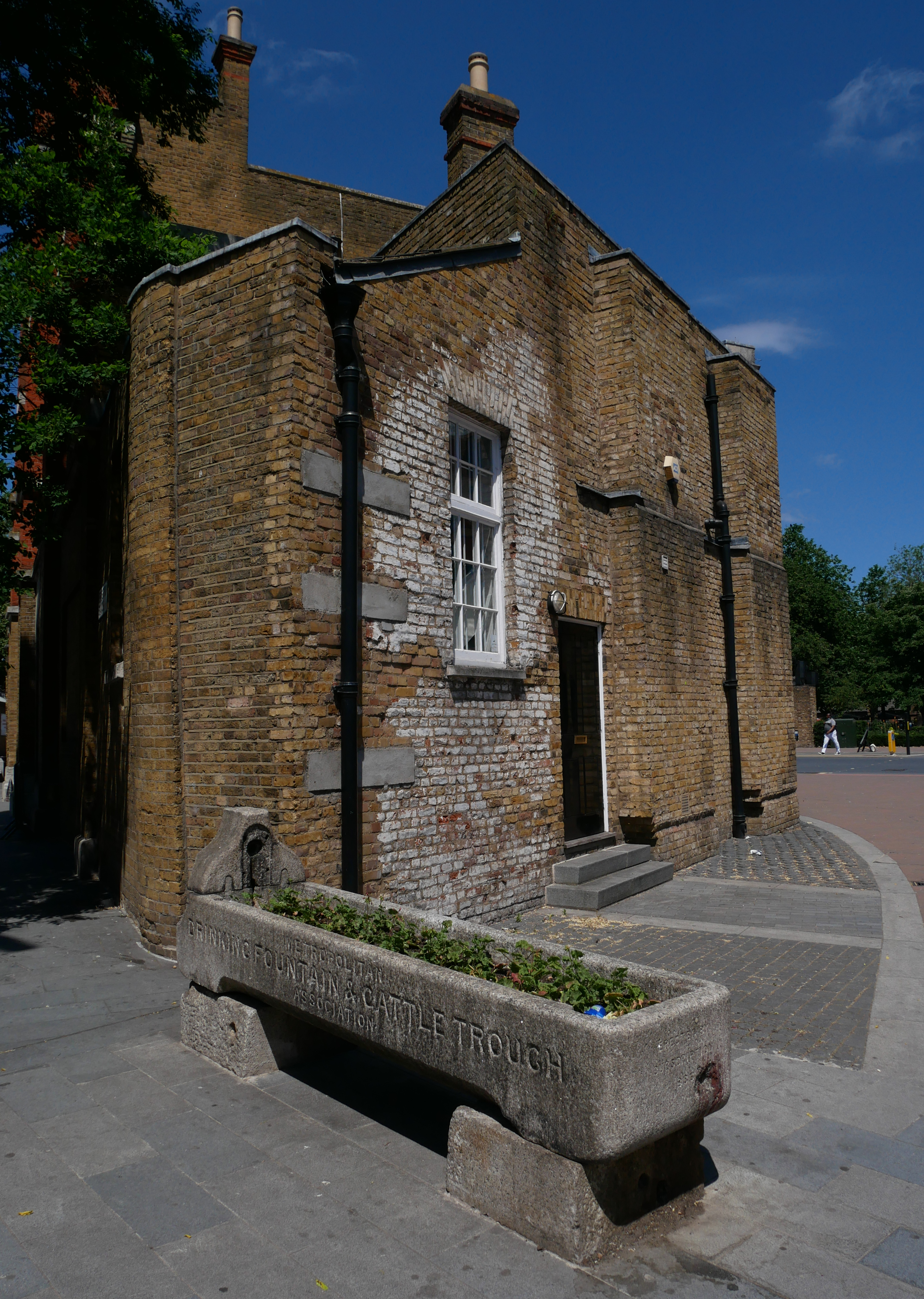
Drinking trough located to the south of the building
