= Beresford Square =

Town and market square in Woolwich, London

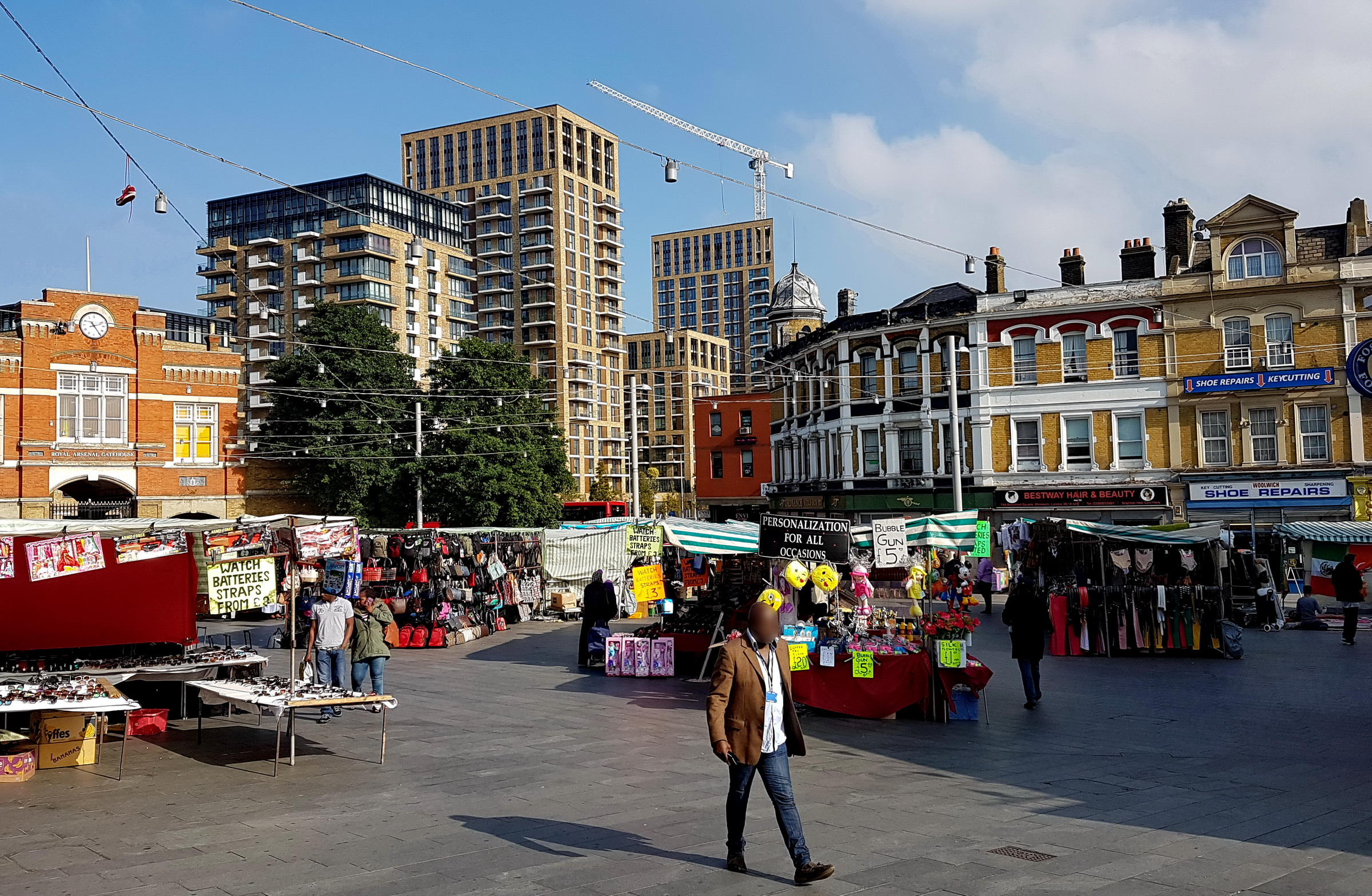
- Beresford Square with market stalls, Royal Arsenal Gatehouse and Crossrail towers

- Location within Greater London
- Maintained by: Greenwich London Borough Council
- Location: Woolwich, South East London
- Postal code: SE18
- Nearest train station: Woolwich Arsenal
- Coordinates: 51.491111°N 0.069167°E

Construction
- Inauguration: 1813

Other
- Known for: Woolwich Market; Royal Arsenal Gatehouse

Beresford Square is a pedestrianised town and market square in Woolwich in the Royal Borough of Greenwich in London, England. It was formed in the early 19th century and was named after the Anglo-Irish general William Beresford, Master-General of the Ordnance and Governor of the Royal Military Academy in Woolwich. Its lively street market and lined with shops, pubs and restaurants, Beresford Square has been the heart of Woolwich for over two centuries. Since 2019 the square is part of a conservation area.

== Location ==
Beresford Square is situated in central Woolwich, between the town's shopping district and the Royal Arsenal, from which it is separated by the busy A206 road. The western section of this road is called Beresford Street, the eastern section Plumstead Road. The square is largely pedestrianised. To the east lies Woolwich New Road, accessible only for buses. Most of the bus stops are on Woolwich New Road or General Gordon Square, around Woolwich Arsenal station. Beresford Square is situated close to the railway and DLR stations, and a short walk from the Elizabeth Line station.

== History ==
=== 19th century ===
Beresford Square is not a laid-out square but the result of a series of clearances. Therefore, some of the buildings are older than the square. In 1812–13, some "paltry buildings" around the road junction near the main entrance to the Arsenal were demolished for "encroachment on Crown land". The northern section of the road that wound down from Woolwich Common to Plumstead Road was called Green's End. The northernmost tip, now the west side of Beresford Square, was known as the High Pavement. Land to the east of this road was part of the Burrage Estate, named after its 14th-century owner, Bartholomew de Burghersh. The Salutation Inn stood almost at the northern end of the High Pavement. It had a tea garden and may have been Woolwich's first theater, mentioned in 1721. The garden later became Salutation Alley with about 20 timber cottages. In one of these Henry Maudslay was born in 1771. Living conditions here were appalling, as described in the Booth Survey of 1900. It was condemned a slum in 1955 and cleared in the 1960s and 70s and is now a market traders' pound. In 1833 the Salutation pub moved to new premises next door. In 1831 four more cottages were cleared on the southeast side of the square, creating more space between the two pubs on this end, the Ordnance Arms and the Elephant & Castle. Along with several pubs on Plumstead Road and the New Road, these all thrived with thousands of Arsenal workers passing through the area every day.

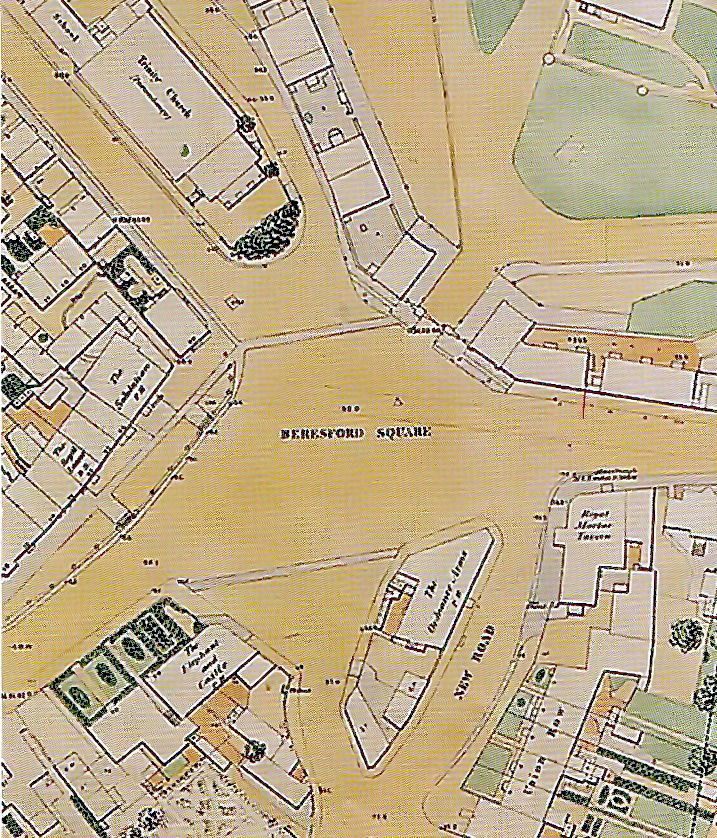
OS map of 1853

The clearance formed a spacious entrance to the Royal Arsenal and in 1828-29 a new entrance gate was built by the Master-General of the Ordnance, William Beresford, 1st Viscount Beresford (1768–1854). It became known as Beresford Gate, later the Royal Arsenal Gatehouse. In 1837 the square too was named after Beresford, when the Board of Ordnance handed it over to the parish of Woolwich. A new road was laid out to its northwest, where the ropeyard had been from around 1570 till 1832, and was named Beresford Street. At the eastern end of this street, facing Beresford Square, Holy Trinity Church was built in 1833-34 (demolished in 1962). This large Anglican church had an imposing facade in Portland stone with a stump tower above a Greek Revival portico.

Woolwich Market received its charter in 1618 but may have existed before. In 1808 it moved from Market Hill (near Woolwich High Street) to Market Street (in the Bathway Quarter). This peripheral location proved to be unpopular with traders, who drifted back to Market Hill and, after 1813, to the new square in front of the Arsenal (where no market tolls had to be paid). The police regularly cleared the square and it was not until 1879 that the existing situation was accepted and regulated. In 1887 the Local Board of Health bought out the Maryon Wilson family's interest in the market charter. A new market was laid out by the Board with room for 136 stalls, against much opposition from costermongers. It officially opened in September 1888. In the middle of the square stood an iron toll house, a drinking fountain and a brightly ornamental urinal. Most of the pubs and shops around the square were rebuilt in the last two decades of the 19th century.

=== 20th and 21st century ===
Throughout the 20th century, Beresford Square remained the centre of Woolwich life. In 1907 some 8,000 Arsenal workers set off from here to demonstrate in Westminster against job cuts. Trade unionist and Labour politician Will Crooks spoke several times to large crowds in front of the Arsenal gate. Crook's memorial service was held on the square in June 1921.

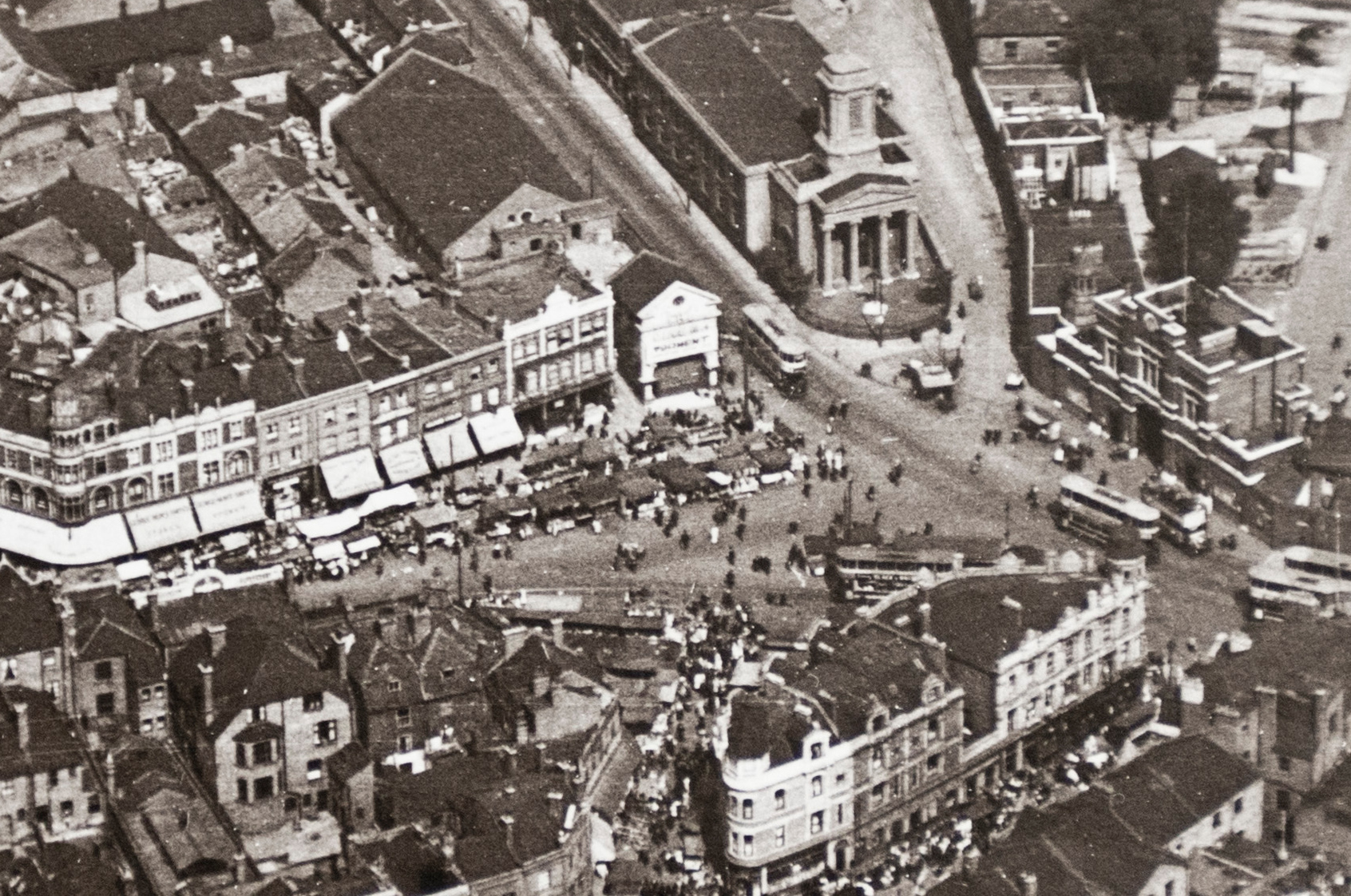
Aerial photograph of 1921

The market was thriving six days a week and drew in shoppers from neighbouring areas. As the market was often overcrowded, plans for extension were made in 1901 but only realized in 1936 with the opening of the covered market on Plumstead Road. Traffic congestion continued to be a major problem with trams and other traffic running through the square. In 1958, 1969 and 1972 plans were presented for the widening of both Beresford Street and Plumstead Road, and the pedestrianisation of the square. Initially, Beresford Gate was to be demolished in the plans approved by the Greater London Council. In 1984-86 the A206 road was rerouted through the Arsenal, north of the gate. In the early 1990s and yet again in 2010–11, Greenwich Council relandscaped the square. A portal reflecting the market's history was erected at its Woolwich New Road entrance. By that time the market's popularity had declined considerably, parallel to the town's general decline after the closure of the Arsenal. With the redevelopment of the Arsenal it is hoped that the market will be reinvigorated.

In 1913, the Woolwich Arsenal Cinematograph Co. started a cinema in a building between the Salutation pub and Holy Trinity Church. Twelve years later it was extended to the rear, replacing much of the north side of Salutation Alley, creating a theater with 669 seats. It was later renamed Premier Cinema, Royal Arsenal Cinema and Century Cinema. It closed in 1964 and was demolished shortly afterwards, along with Holy Trinity, the Salutations Inn and other neighbouring buildings.

In May 2019 the square became part of a conservation area. The Woolwich Conservation Area comprises Greens End, General Gordon Square, parts of Woolwich New Road, the Bathway Quarter, Powis Street, Hare Street, Mortgramit Square, parts of Woolwich High Street (south) and St Mary's Church and Gardens.

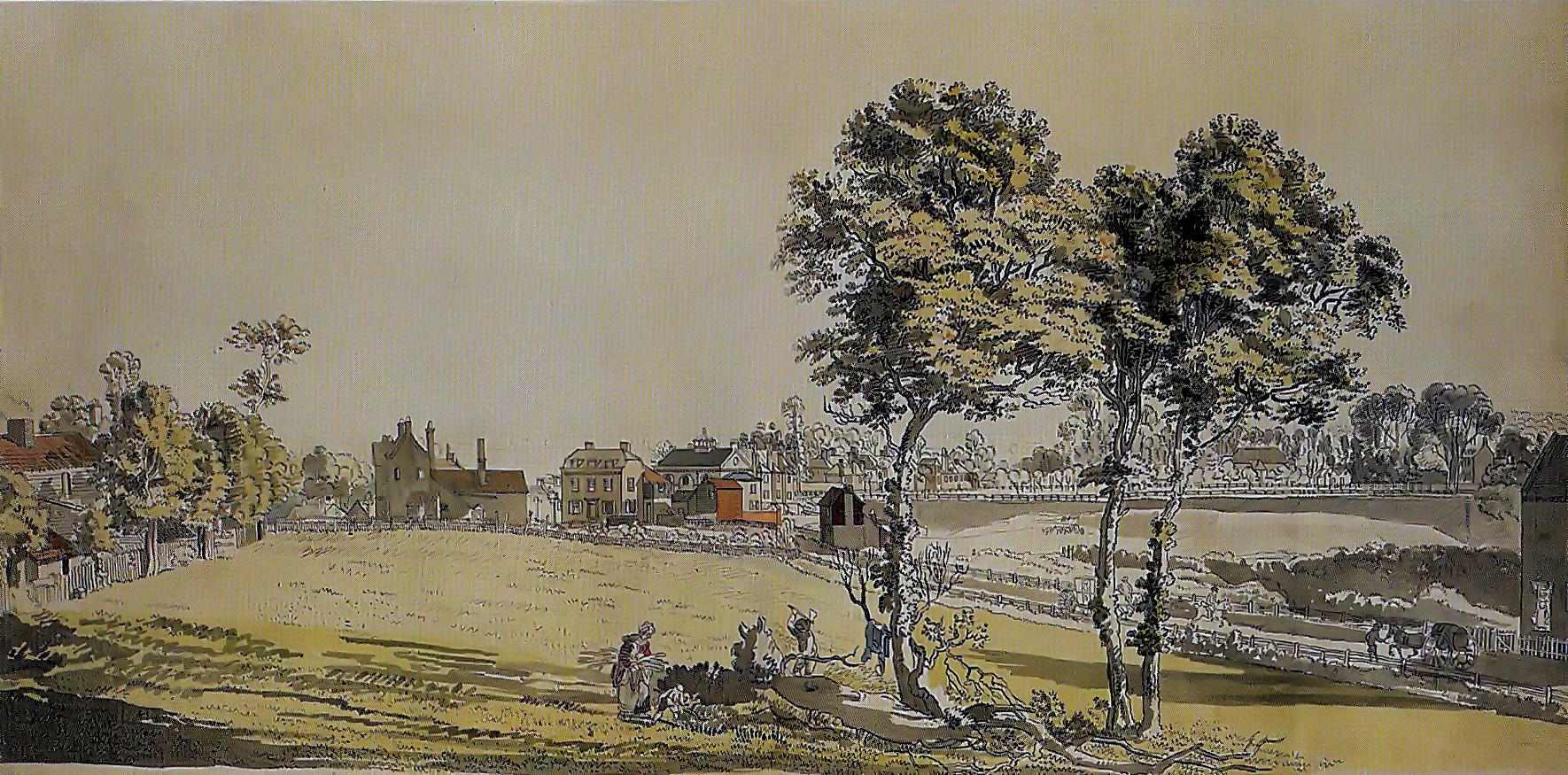
Green's End, now central Woolwich, c. 1790

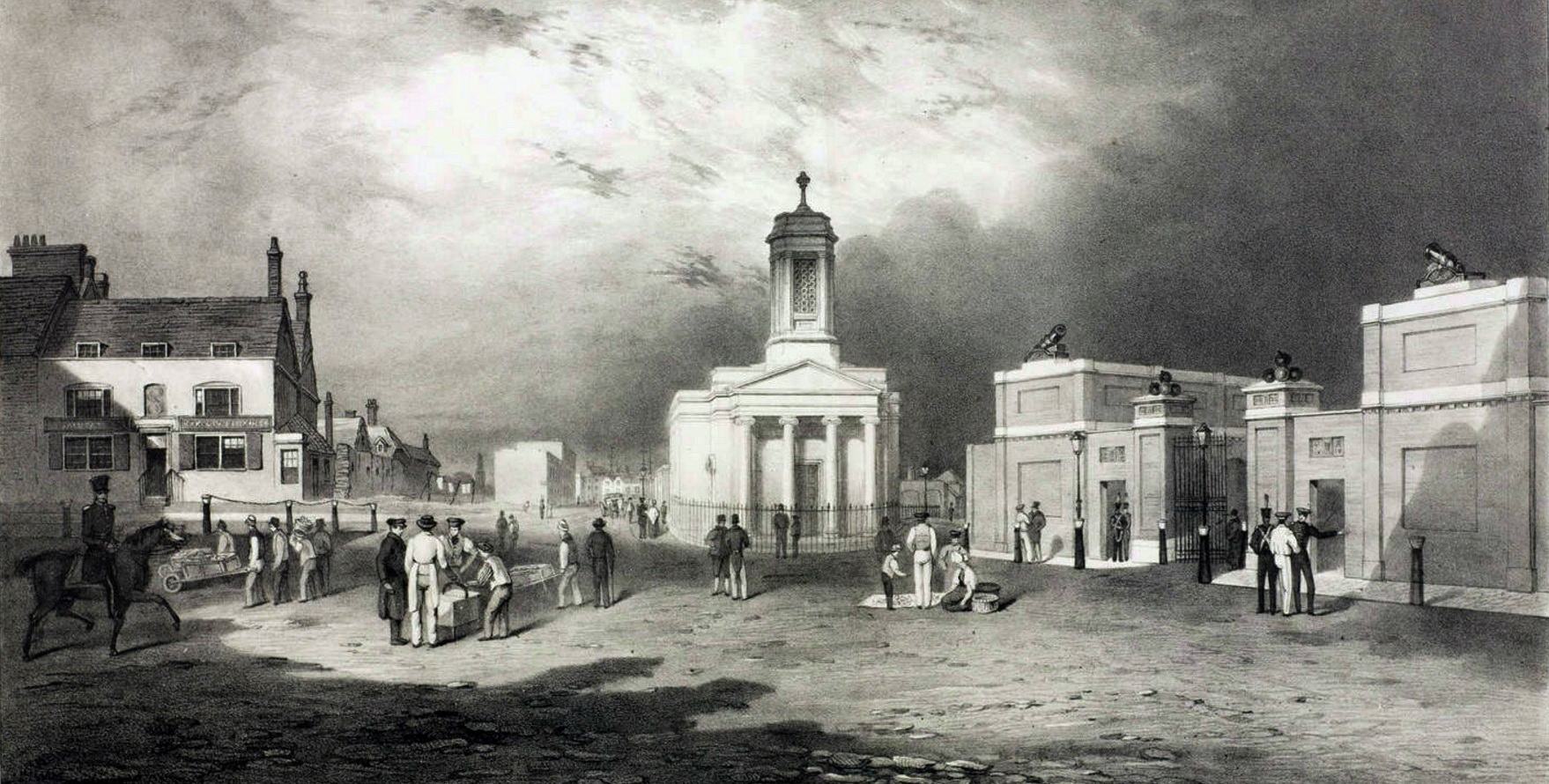
The new square, c. 1835

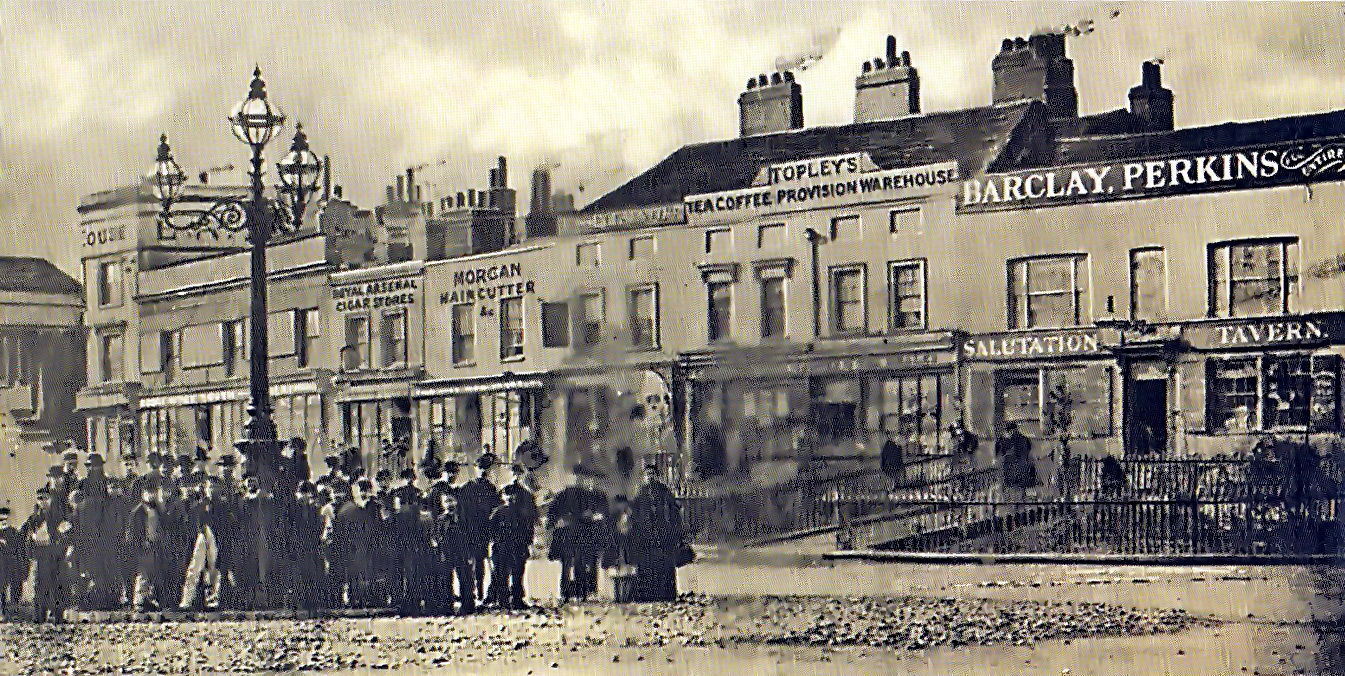
The High Pavement in 1868

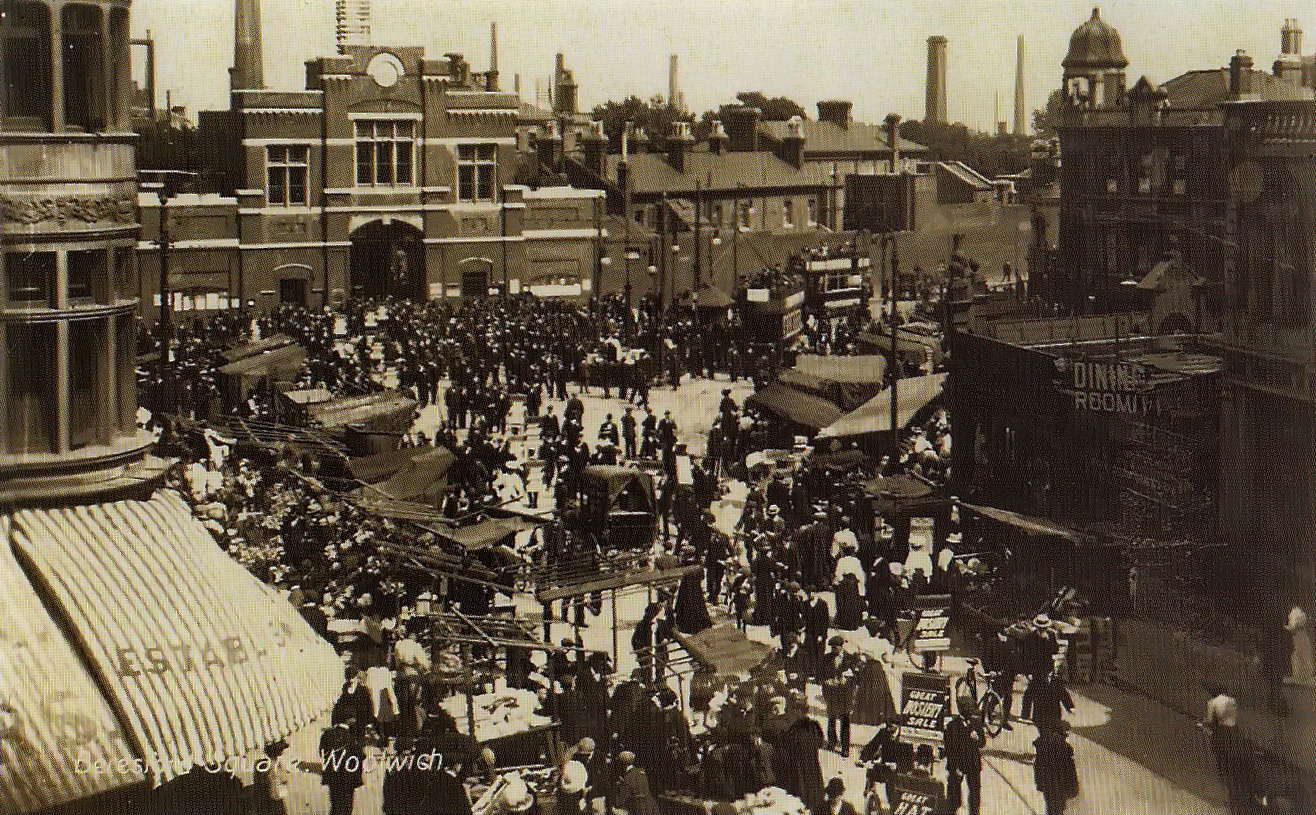
The square in the early 20th century

== Description ==
=== Northwest side ===
The Royal Arsenal Gatehouse or Beresford Gate stands solitary at the north end of the square, isolated from the Arsenal since the rerouting of the A206. It was designed by Colonel John T. Jones in 1828. The oldest parts are of plain yellow stock brick with some stone detailing. The later additions are of red brick and feature three large windows on each side and a clock at the top of its south-facing gable. The gate has three openings which are currently closed off by iron fences. The gatehouse is flanked by two original pavilions, both adorned with recessed rectangular panels and surmounted by brass mortars. An 1859 western annex features a bell tower. Two cattle drinking troughs of the Metropolitan Drinking Fountain and Cattle Trough Association from the 1890s and two modern stone benches have been placed on the south side of the gatehouse.

The row of buildings at what was once called the High Pavement are modern (Newman, Levinson & Partners, 1969–70), except for a modest late-19th-century survivor in the middle (nr. 5; Chessum & Sons, 1892–93). The public lavatories, underground since 1913, were rebuilt above-ground in the early 1990s. In front of the plain brick building stands another cattle drinking trough, this one from 1904.

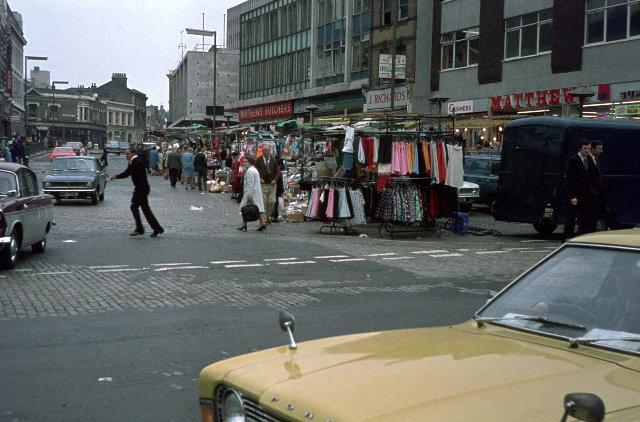
Northwest section before pedestrianisation, 1974

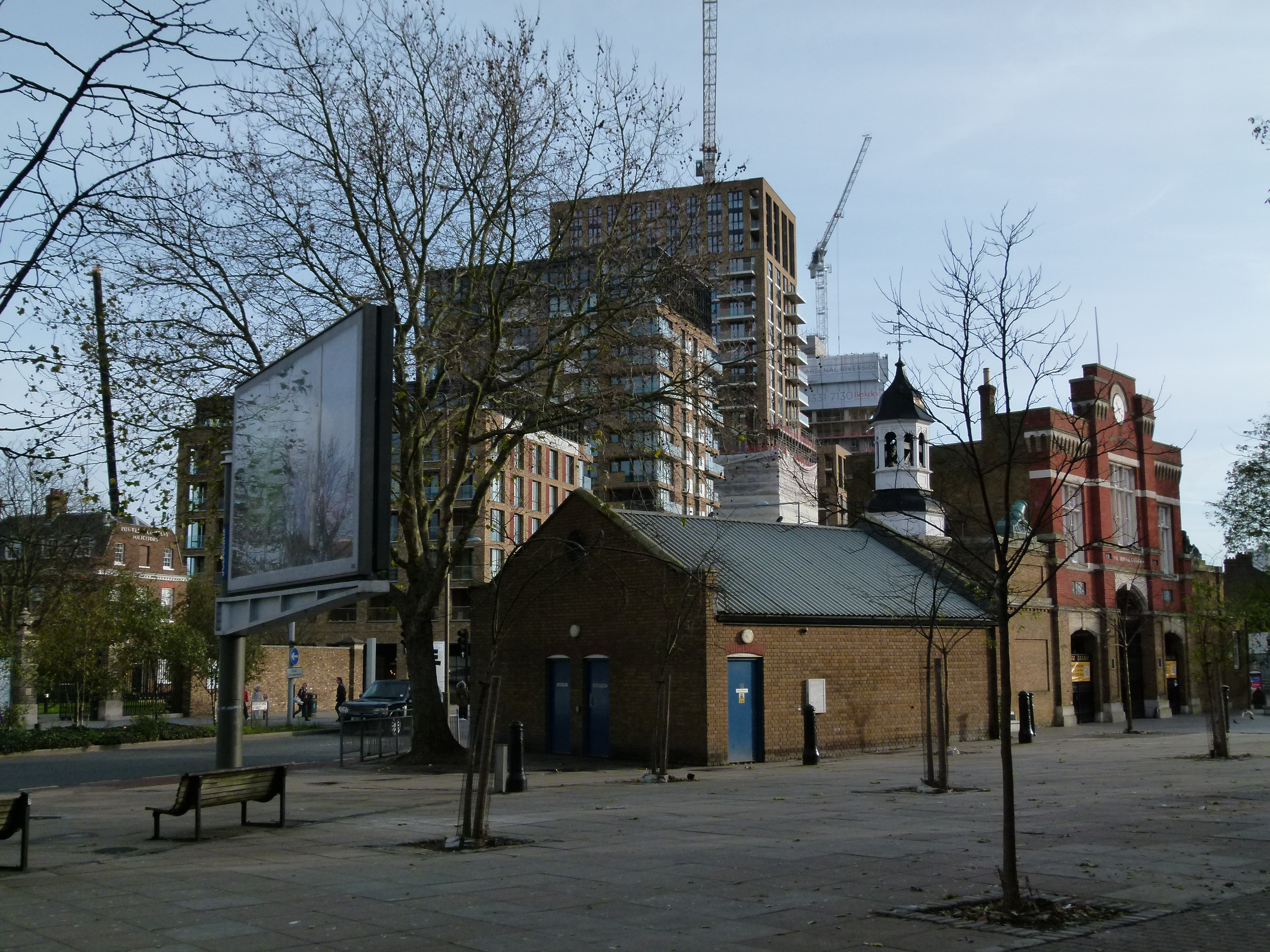
View towards Plumstead Road

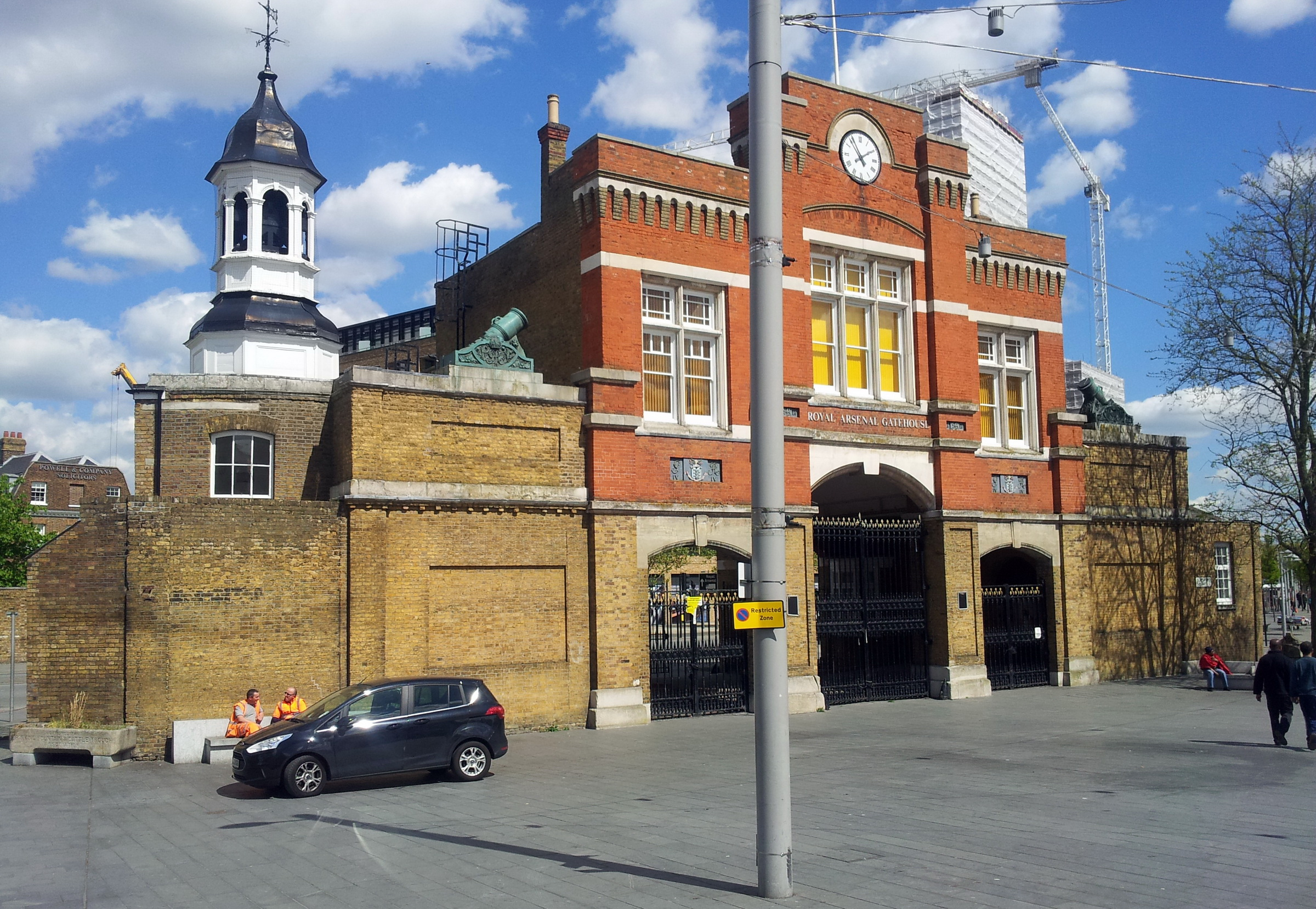
Royal Arsenal Gatehouse

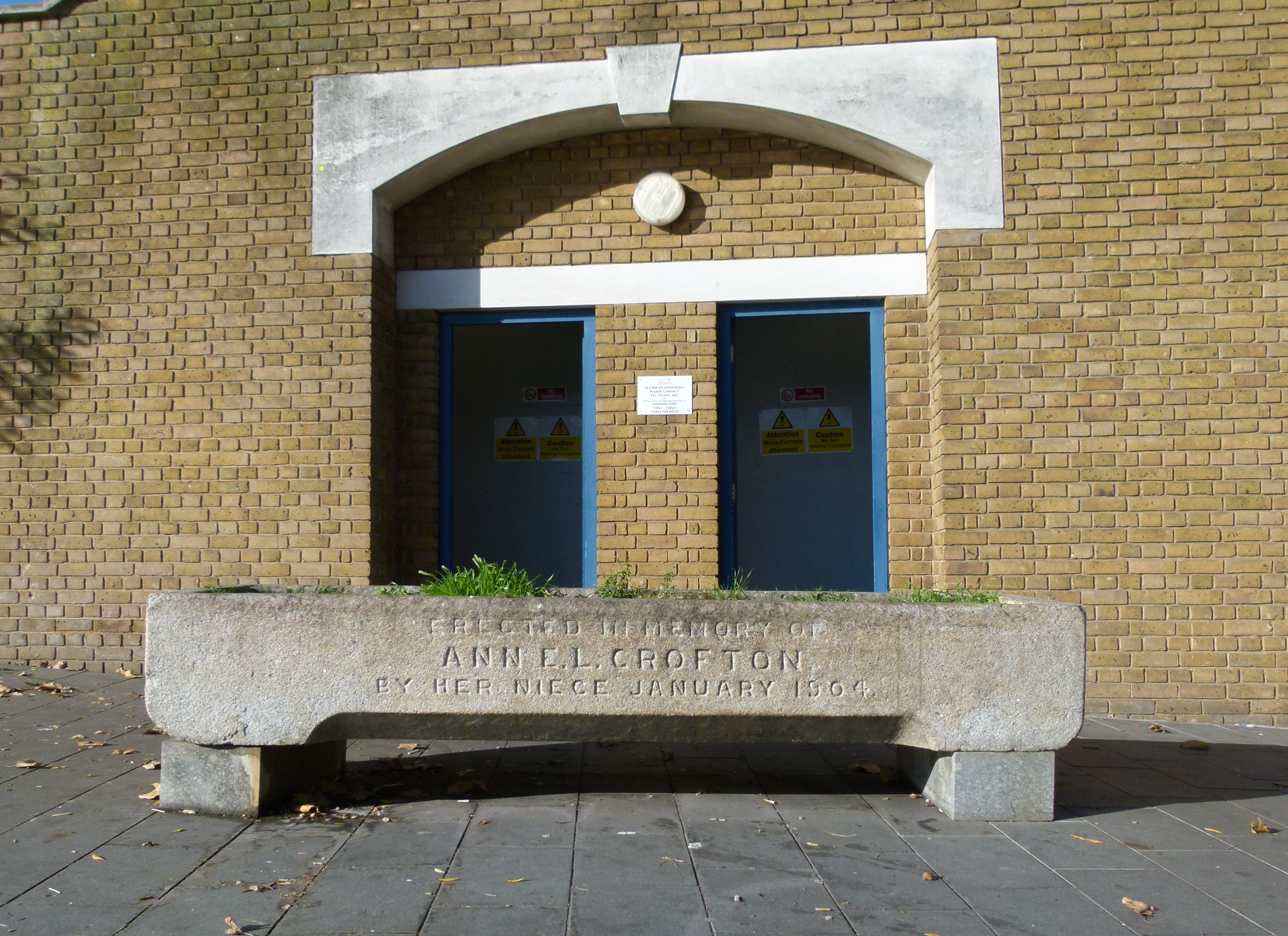
Lavatories and cattle trough, 1904

=== Southeast side ===
The east side consists of an imposing block of late-Victorian, Italianate buildings, including the Ordnance Arms public house and three shops, all with frontages on the market square and the New Road (J. Chapman, 1888). An ogee-domed turret on one end of the block matches an octagonal one on the other corner. The pub featured a first-floor club room, now a church hall. After being renamed O'Connors for a while, the pub retook its original name in 2015. The market gate of the early 1990s consists of a two-sided metal portal. The brightly coloured decorations refer to the long history of Woolwich Market.

Since 1935, the back of Equitable House, the former head office of the Woolwich Equitable Building Society, looms over the smaller buildings on the south side of Beresford Square. Two houses that probably date from the early 1780s, 18-19 Green's End, are the oldest in the square. Both houses have been altered and have forward extensions for commercial use, which makes it difficult to appreciate them. They were admired by John Betjeman in 1965. No. 18 became the Elephant & Castle public house in 1848, deriving its name from a famous inn in South London. The present-day pub extension dates from the late 1950s and includes the premises next-door, 10 Beresford Square. All other buildings on this side date from the 1880s. Adjacent to no. 19 is now a vacant lot next to the new station for the Docklands Light Railway, that was built here in 2005–09.

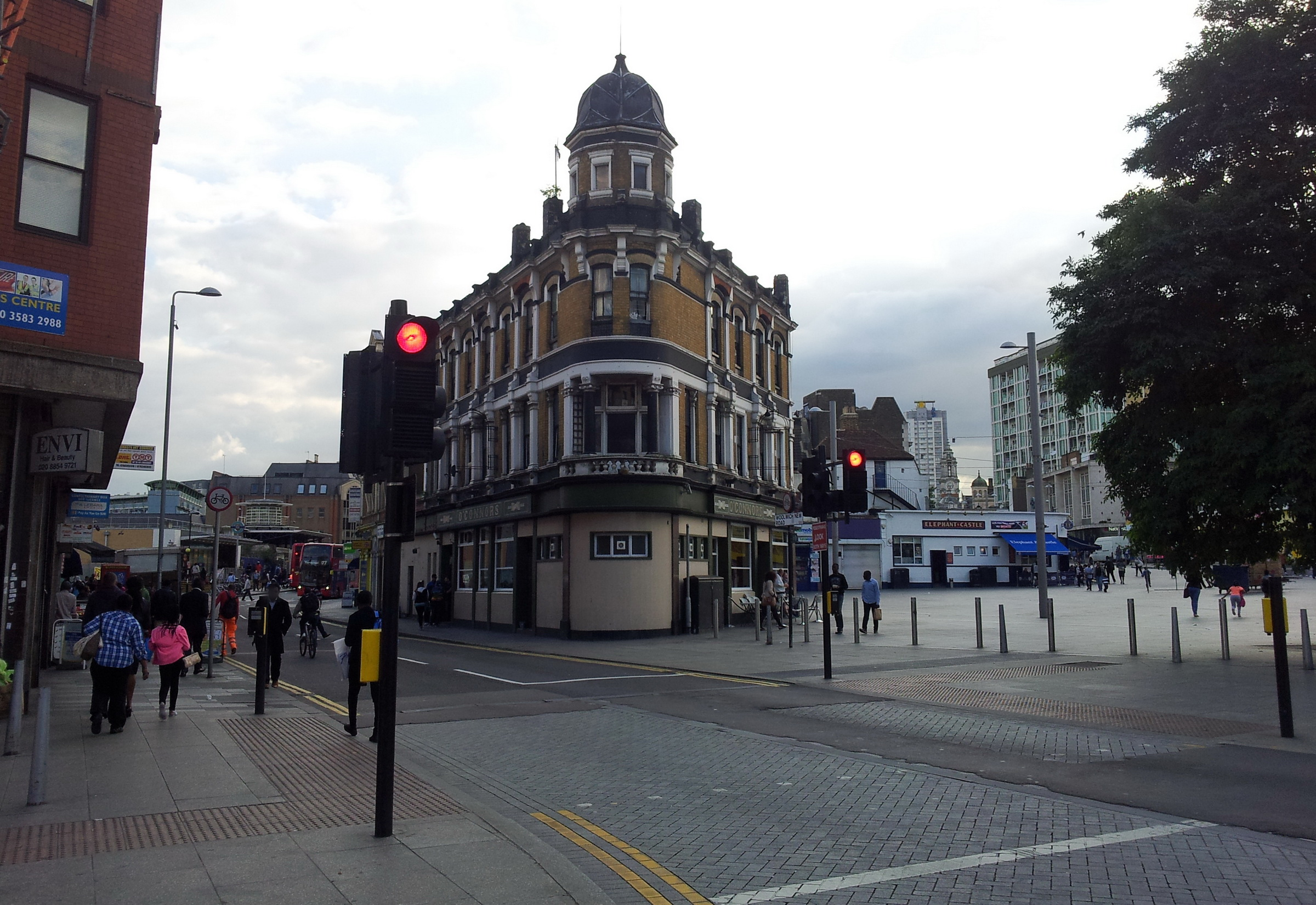
View from Woolwich New Road towards the Ordnance Arms pub

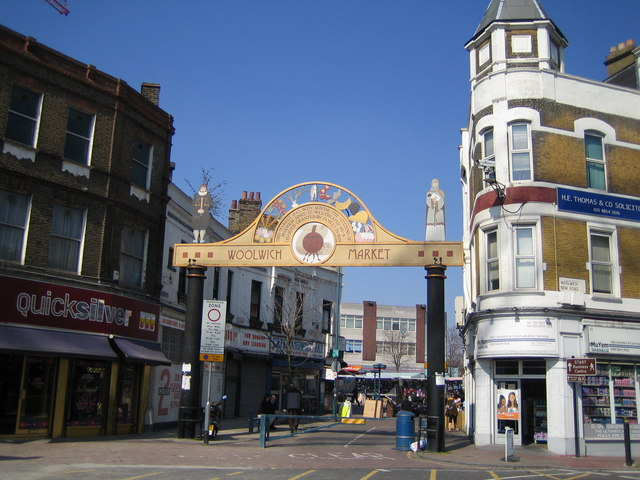
Woolwich New Road entrance with Victorian buildings and market portal

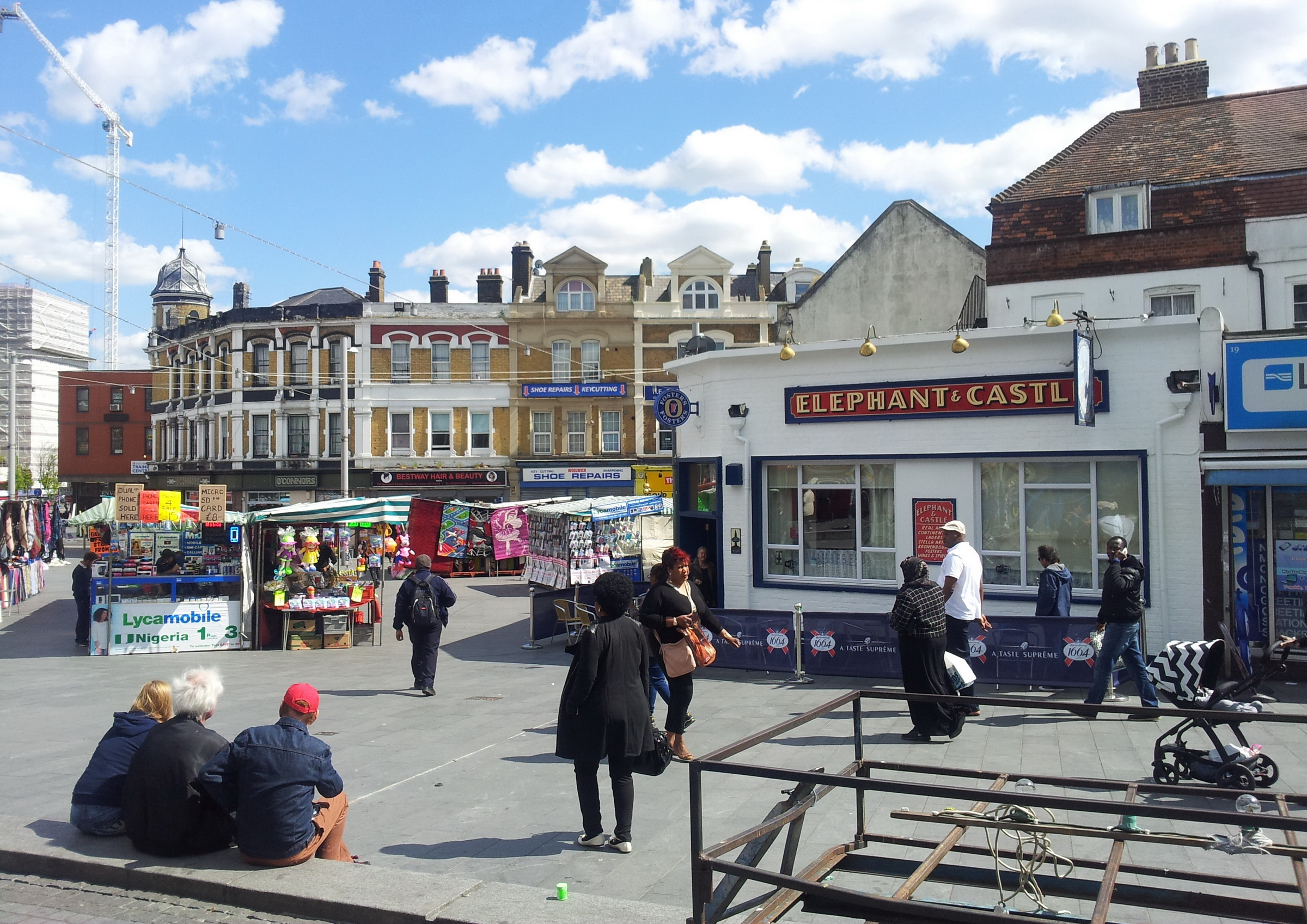
Market stalls and Elephant & Castle pub; behind the pub Green's End No. 18

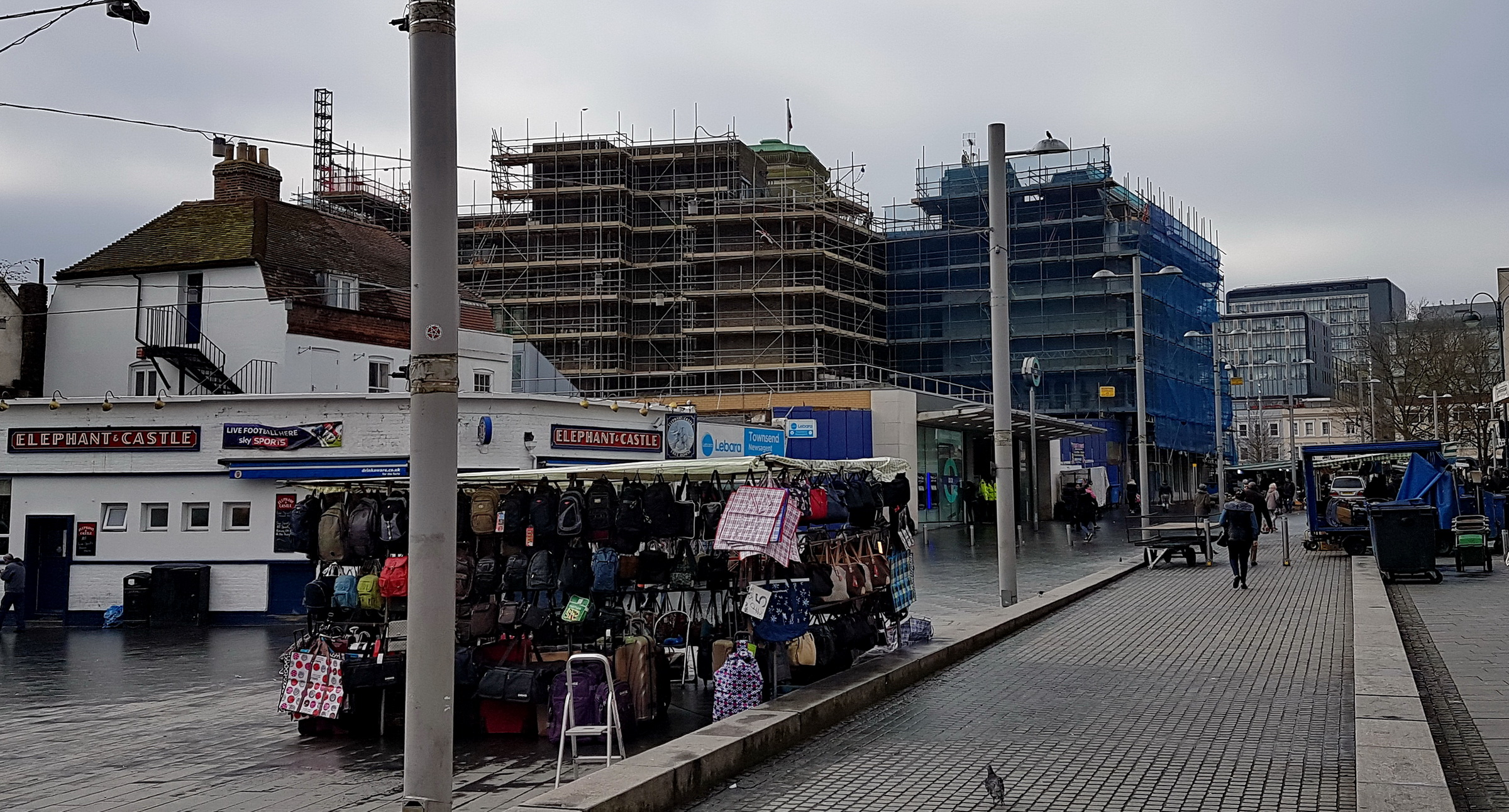
Former High Pavement; view towards Equitable House

== Pedestrianisation ==
Starting in 2009 and ending in Spring 2012, Beresford Square, along with the neighbouring Greens End and General Gordon Square, was redeveloped to be more centred on pedestrians. Bus stops were also relocated on Beresford Street and Thomas Street. Since 2019, buses cannot turn right from Beresford Street on to Woolwich New Road, as a result of a separate redevelopment scheme on Plumstead Road, including the brief use of the former Woolwich Public Market as Public, a street-food market owned by the former company Street Feast, who also opened markets in Canary Wharf, Canada Water, Lewisham and Shoreditch.
