= Woolwich =

District in southeast London, England

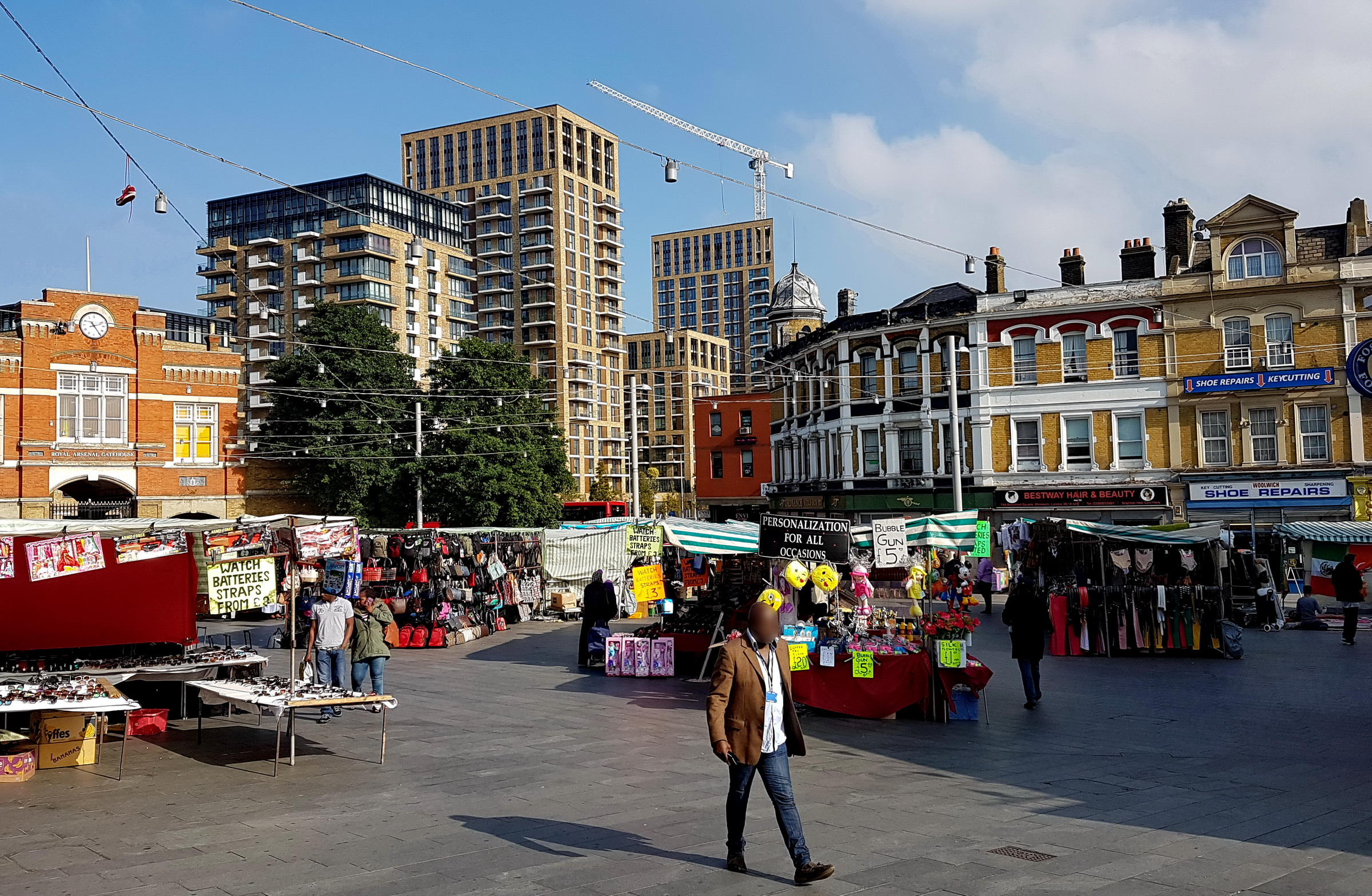
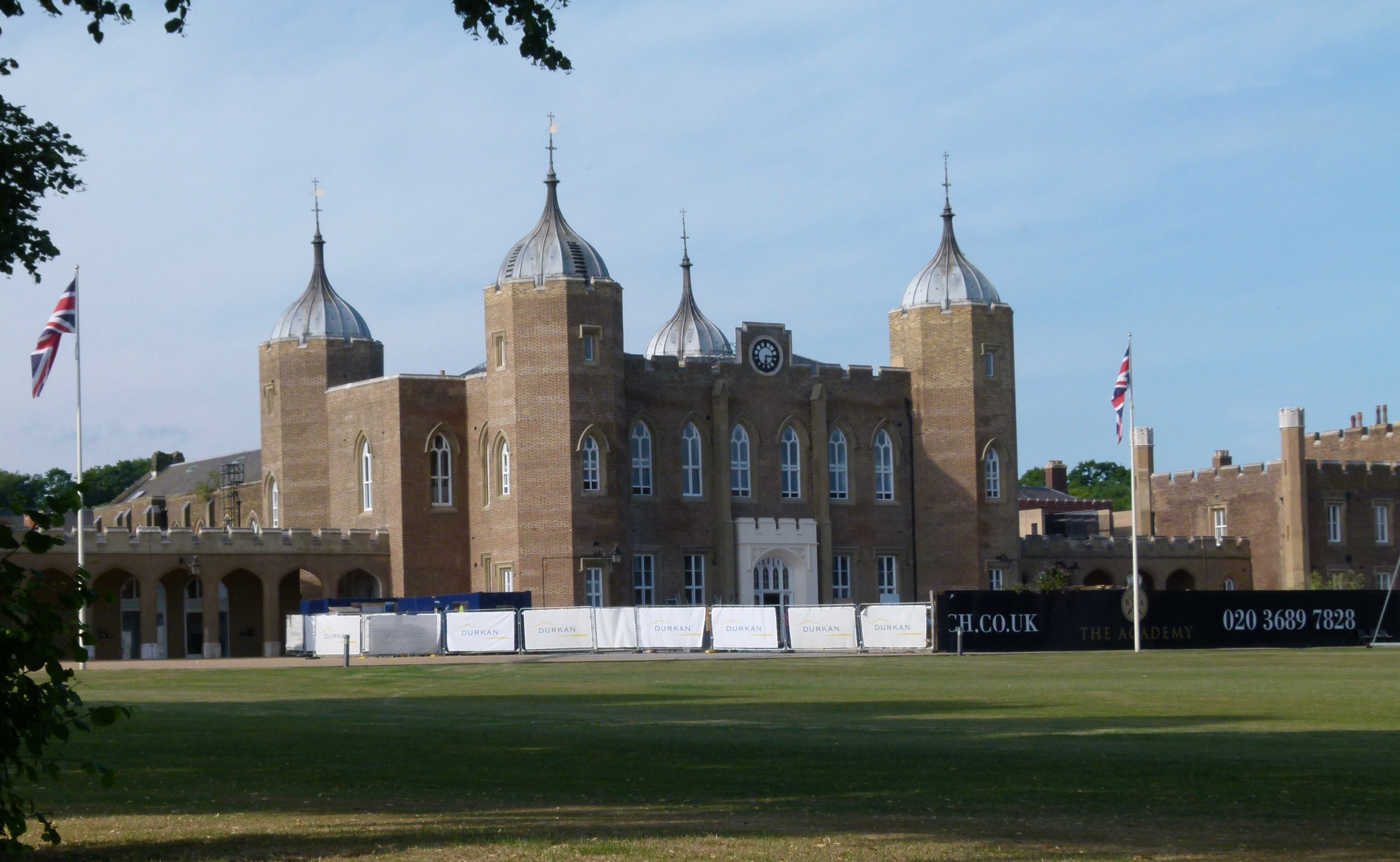
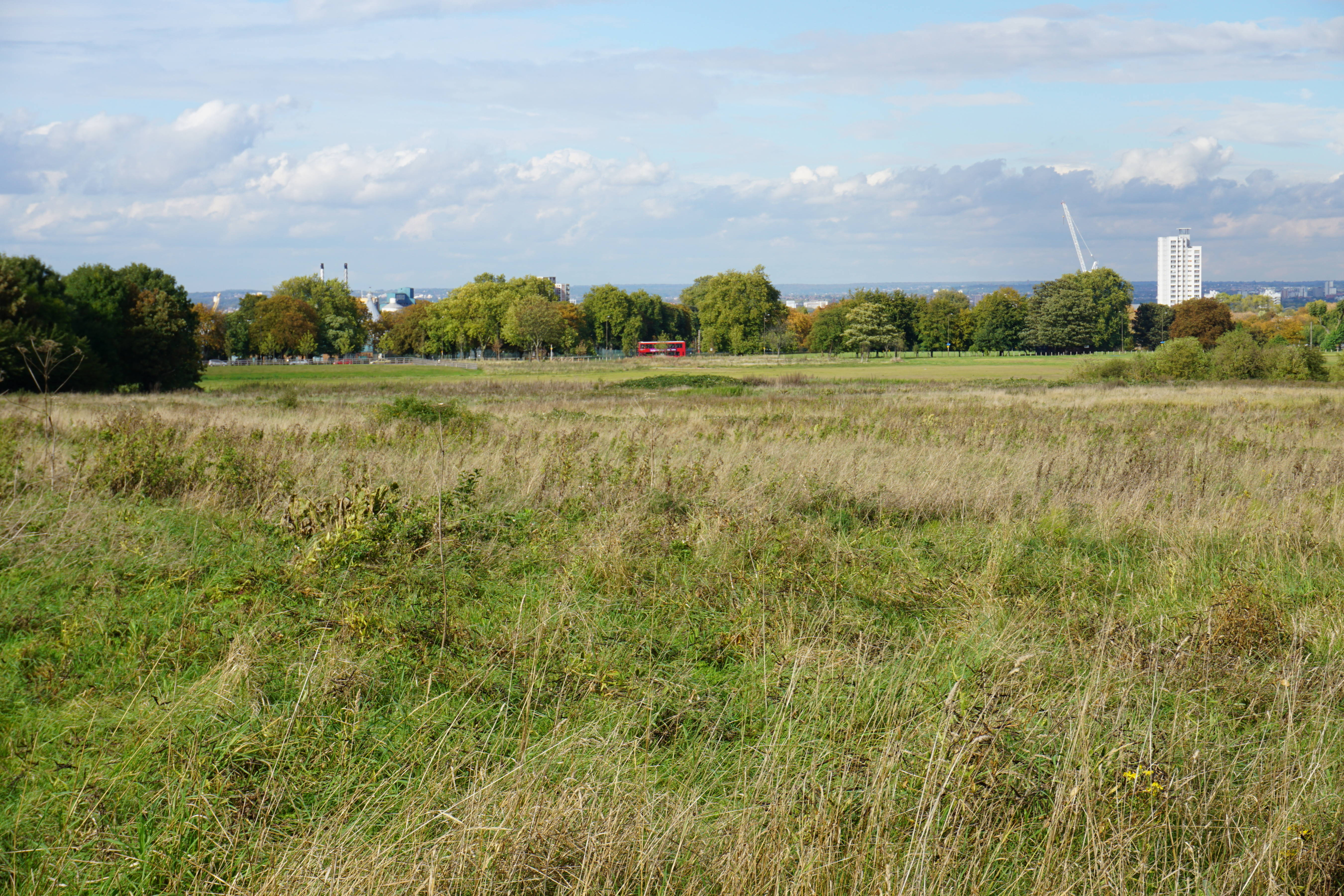
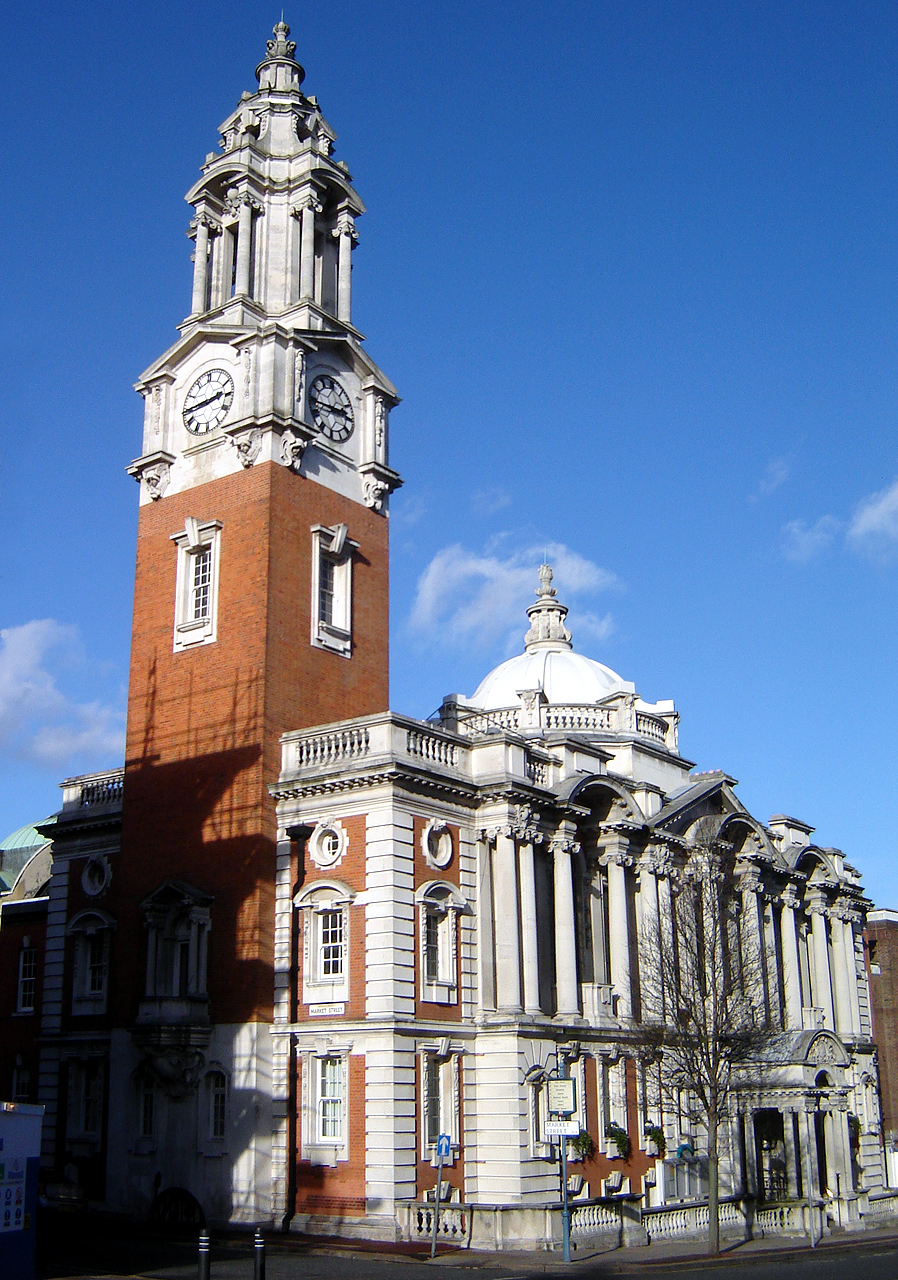
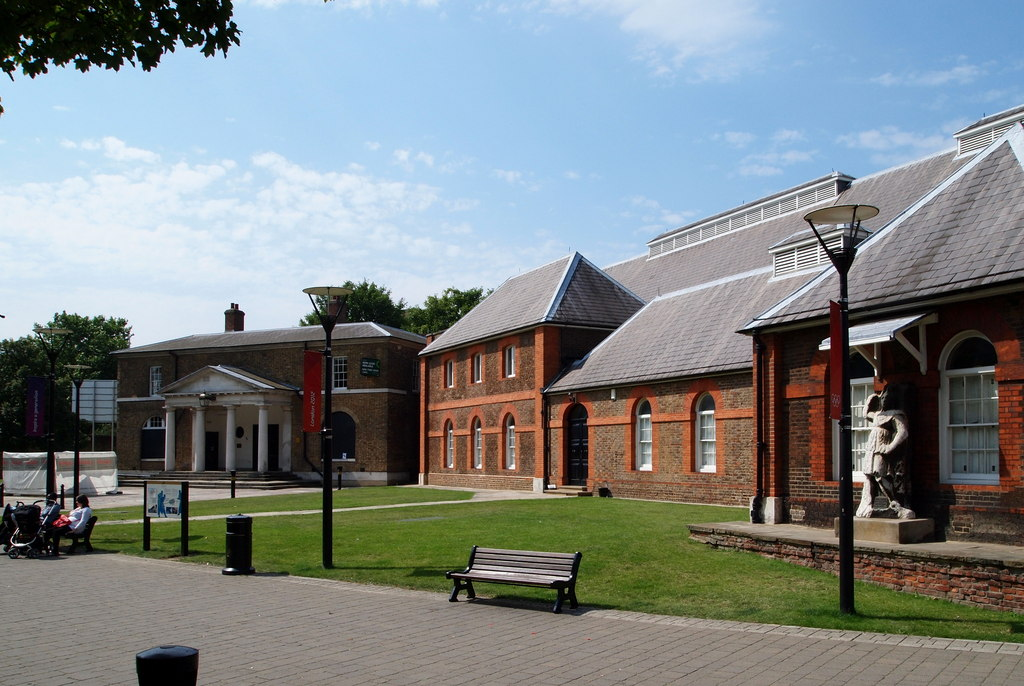
- Beresford Square market Royal Military Academy Woolwich Common Town Hall Royal Arsenal

- Location within Greater London
- Population: 84,959 (2011 Census)
- OS grid reference: TQ435795
  - Charing Cross: 8.5 mi (13.7 km) WNW
- London borough: Greenwich
- Ceremonial county: Greater London
- Region: London
- Country: England
- Sovereign state: United Kingdom
- Post town: LONDON
- Postcode district: SE18
- Dialling code: 020
- Police: Metropolitan
- Fire: London
- Ambulance: London
- UK Parliament: Greenwich and Woolwich
- London Assembly: Greenwich and Lewisham

Woolwich (/ˈwʊlɪtʃ, -ɪdʒ/) is a market town in south-east London, England, within the Royal Borough of Greenwich.

The district's location on the River Thames led to its status as an important naval, military and industrial area; a role that was maintained throughout the 16th to 20th centuries. After several decades of economic hardship and social deprivation, the area now has several large-scale urban renewal projects.

== Geography ==
Woolwich is situated 8.5 miles (13.7 km) from Charing Cross. It has a 1.6 mi (2.5 km) long frontage to the south bank of the River Thames. From the riverside it rises up quickly along the northern slopes of Shooter's Hill towards the common, at 200 ft (60 m) and the ancient London–Dover Road, at 433 ft (132 m). The ancient parish of Woolwich, more or less the present-day wards Woolwich Riverside and Woolwich Common, comprises 734 acres (297 ha). This included North Woolwich, which is now part of the London Borough of Newham. The ancient parishes of Plumstead and Eltham became part of the civil parish of Woolwich in 1930. Parts of the wards Glyndon and Shooter's Hill are often referred to as Woolwich, although this definition is not accepted by all. The nearest areas are Abbey Wood, Blackheath, Charlton, Eltham, Greenwich, Kidbrooke, Lewisham, North Woolwich, Plumstead, Shooter's Hill, Thamesmead, Welling and Well Hall.

== Demography ==
Census data is collected by borough and ward so identifying the population of Woolwich is not straightforward. If the area is taken to approximate to the Woolwich Common, Woolwich Riverside and Glyndon Wards, then the population was 54,790 at the time of the 2011 census.

If it is also taken to include the Plumstead and Shooters Hill Wards then it rises to 84,959 at the 2011 census.

== History ==
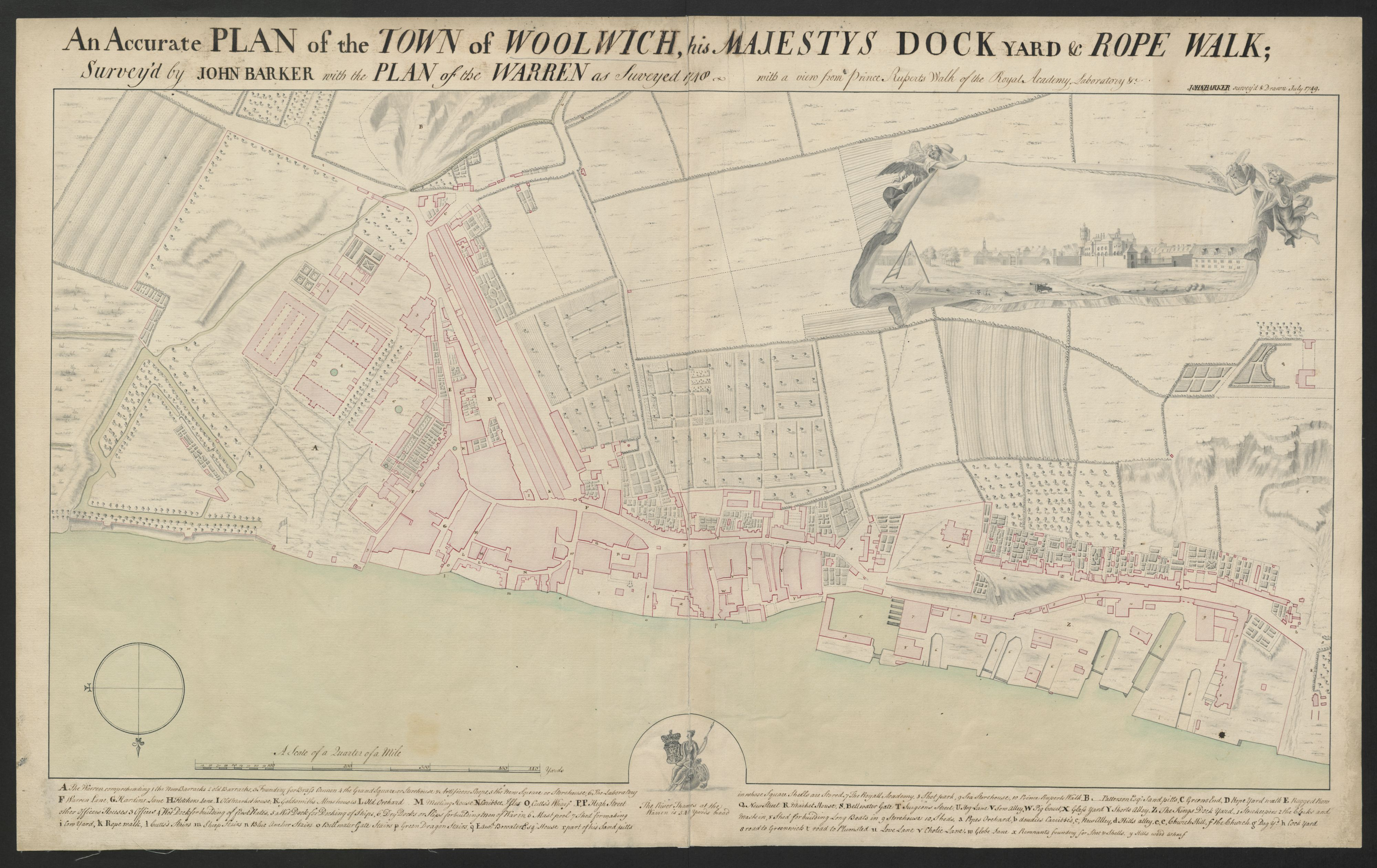
Map of Woolwich, 1749: the town is nestled between the Warren to the east (left) and HM Dockyard to the west (bottom right).

=== Early history ===
Woolwich has been inhabited since at least the Iron Age. Remains of a probably Celtic oppidum, established sometime between the 3rd and 1st century BCE, in the late Roman period re-used as a fort, were found at the current Waterfront development site between Beresford Street and the Thames. According to the Survey of London (Volume 48: Woolwich), "this defensive earthwork encircled the landward sides of a riverside settlement, the only one of its kind so far located in the London area, that may have been a significant port, anterior to London". A path connected the riverside settlement with Watling Street (Shooter's Hill), perhaps also of Iron Age origin. Sandy Hill Road may be a remnant of this early path.

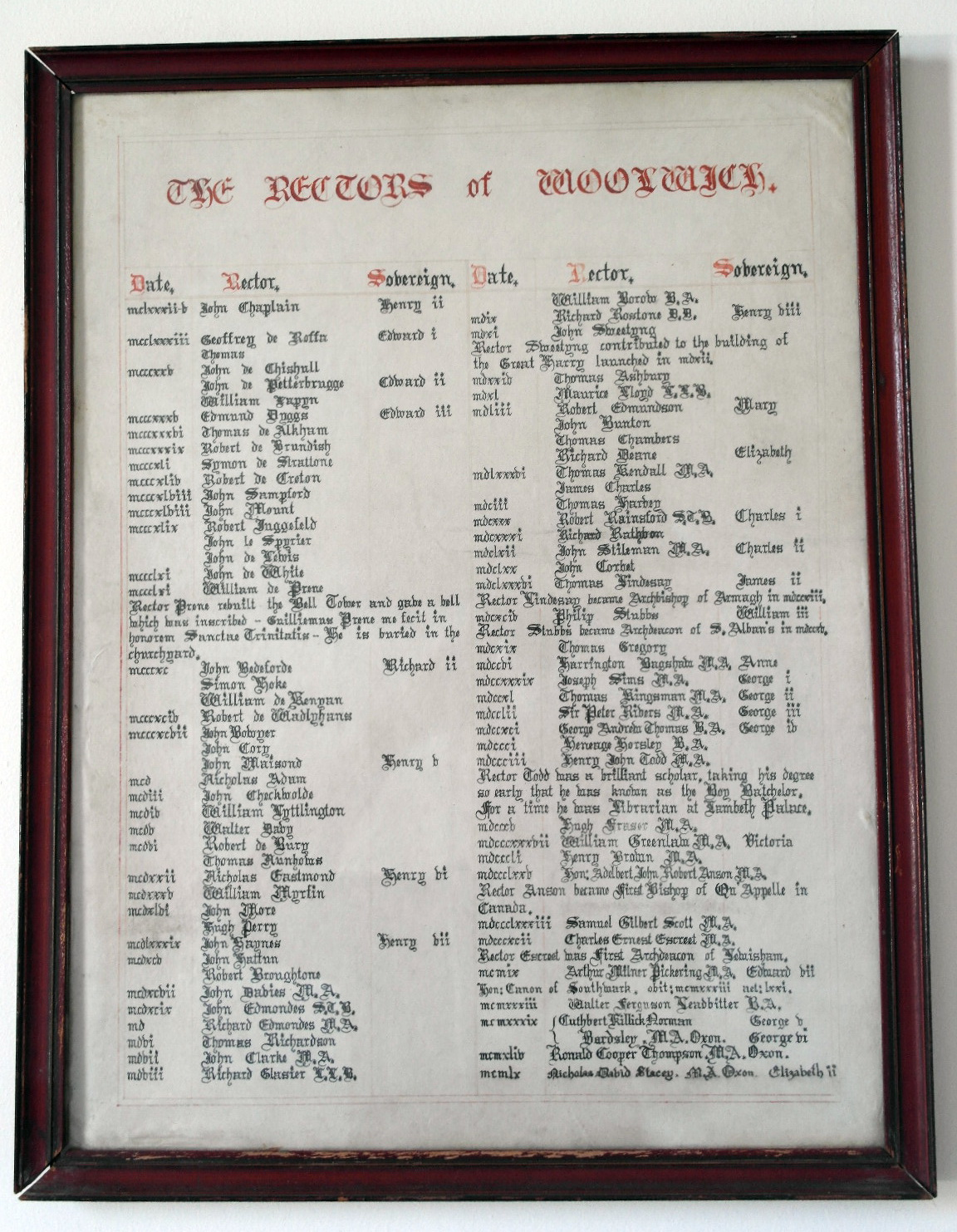
Rectors of Woolwich from 1182

It is generally believed that the name Woolwich derives from an Anglo-Saxon word meaning "trading place for wool". It is not clear whether Woolwich was a proper -wich town, since there are no traces of extensive artisanal activity from the Early Middle Ages. However, in 2015 Oxford Archaeology discovered a Saxon burial site near the riverside with 76 skeletons from the late 7th or early 8th century. The absence of grave deposits indicates that this was an early Christian settlement. The first church, which stood to the north of the present parish church, was almost certainly pre-Norman and dedicated to Saint Lawrence. It was probably rebuilt in stone around 1100.

From the 10th till the mid-12th century Woolwich was controlled by the abbots of St. Peter's Abbey in Ghent. This may have been a result of a gift of 918 from Ælfthryth, daughter of King Alfred and Countess of Flanders, in that case the first recorded grant of English lands to a foreign ecclesiastic institution. As a result of this tenure Woolwich is not mentioned in the Domesday Book; it is thought that the 63 acres listed as Hulviz refer to North Woolwich, which was then uninhabited. Some of the Ghent lands passed to the royal manors of Dartford and Eltham as early as 1100; the larger part of the parish, referred to as the manor of Woolwich but in effect not a full manor, became an Eltham dependency in the 14th century. Not included were a riverside quay held by Holy Trinity Priory, a wharf held by St Mary's Priory, Southwark, and land around Plumstead owned by Bartholomew de Burghersh, 2nd Baron Burghersh, later referred to as the Burrage Estate.

Medieval Woolwich was susceptible to flooding. In 1236 many were killed by a flood. Woolwich Ferry was first mentioned in 1308 but may be older. Around Bell Water Gate some private shipbuilding or repair may have existed in the 15th century. A windmill was mentioned around 1450. Several pottery kilns have been discovered north of Woolwich High Street and Beresford Street, testifying to a perhaps unbroken tradition of pottery production from at least the 14th century until the 17th century.

=== Military expansion ===
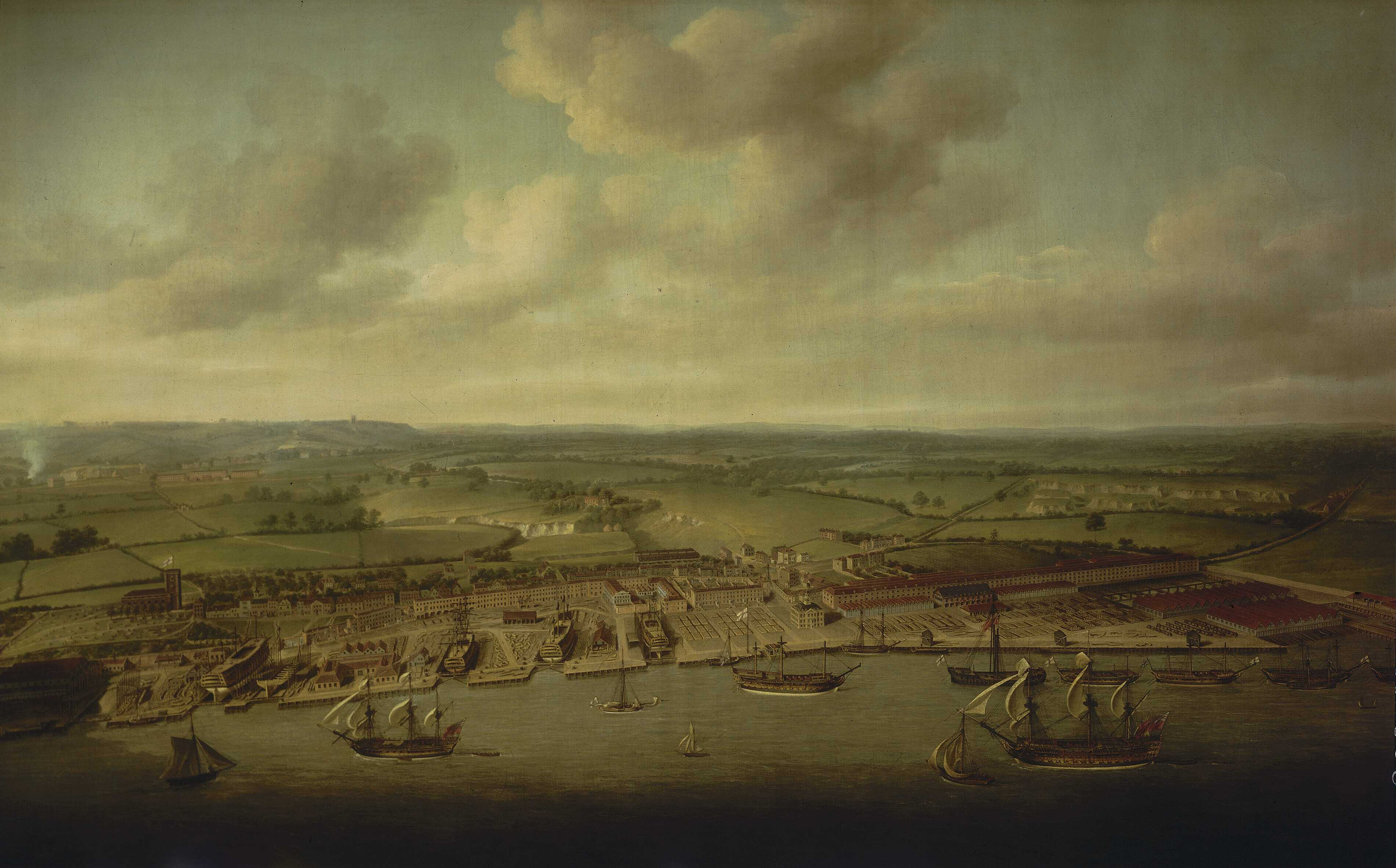
1790 painting of Woolwich Dockyard by Nicholas Pocock

Woolwich remained a relatively small Kentish settlement until the beginning of the 16th century, when it began to develop into a maritime, military and industrial centre. In 1512 it became home to Woolwich Dockyard, originally known as "The King's Yard", founded by Henry VIII to build his flagship Henry Grace à Dieu ("The Great Harry"). Many great ships were built here, such as the Prince Royal, the Sovereign of the Seas, the Naseby, the Dolphin and the Beagle. East of the dockyard a gun yard was established in the 1540s (for storage and maintenance of ships' cannons and armaments) and a ropeyard followed in the 1570s. The dockyard went through many ups and downs but survived for three and a half centuries, closing down in 1869.

Following the establishment of the dockyard, Martin Bowes who had gathered a fortune at the Royal Mint, bought riverside holdings in Woolwich and Plumstead in the 1530s, some of it former church land that had become available after the Dissolution of the Monasteries. His mansion was Tower Place, for some time the largest dwelling in Woolwich. In the 1650s the Board of Ordnance was given permission to prove guns in the grounds of the mansion (an area known as the Warren) and twenty years later they purchased Tower Place itself. The Warren then developed from a place of storage into a collection of armament factories, military stores and research establishments, which were collectively named the Royal Arsenal by George III in 1805. The complex played a central role in Britain's military and industrial expansion: in wartime, tens of thousands of workers found employment here; between wars, unemployment loomed.

The Board of Ordnance maintained its own establishment of military personnel, many of whom were based in the Warren. In 1716 it had (by a royal warrant of George I) formed the Royal Regiment of Artillery, which had its headquarters and barracks in the Warren, and in 1741 it established the Royal Military Academy there to train its future officers. In 1776 the Artillery moved out of the Warren into a new Royal Artillery Barracks on the edge of Woolwich Common. The Royal Military Academy followed, moving into its new premises at the other end of the common in 1806. By that time various other units and services had begun to establish themselves in the vicinity, forming what became known as Woolwich Garrison. In the 19th and 20th century several large barracks were built, as well as military schools and hospitals. To this day, the town retains an army base (known as Woolwich Station) centred on the Royal Artillery Barracks and Napier Lines Barracks.

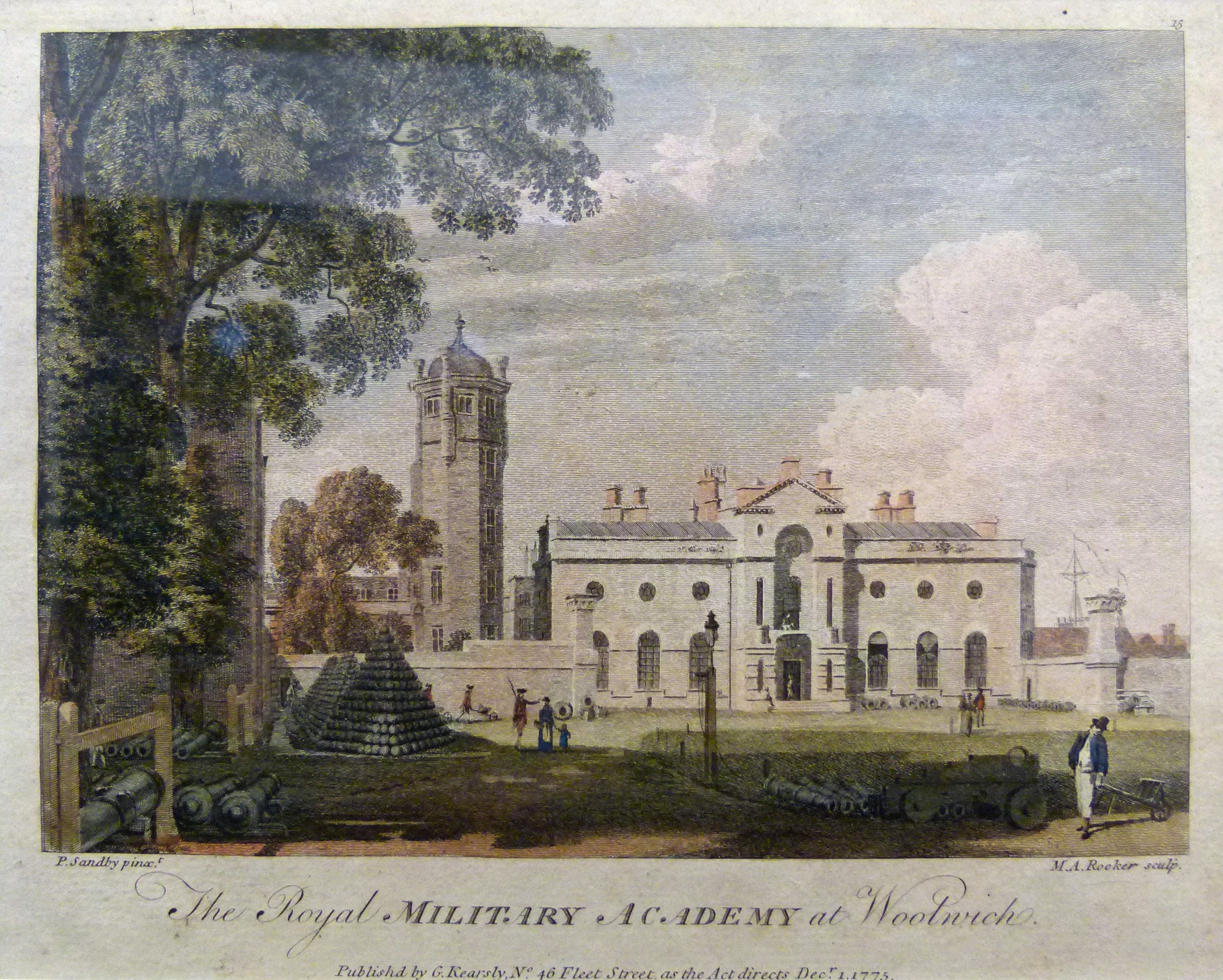
Tower Place and the old Royal Military Academy, 1775

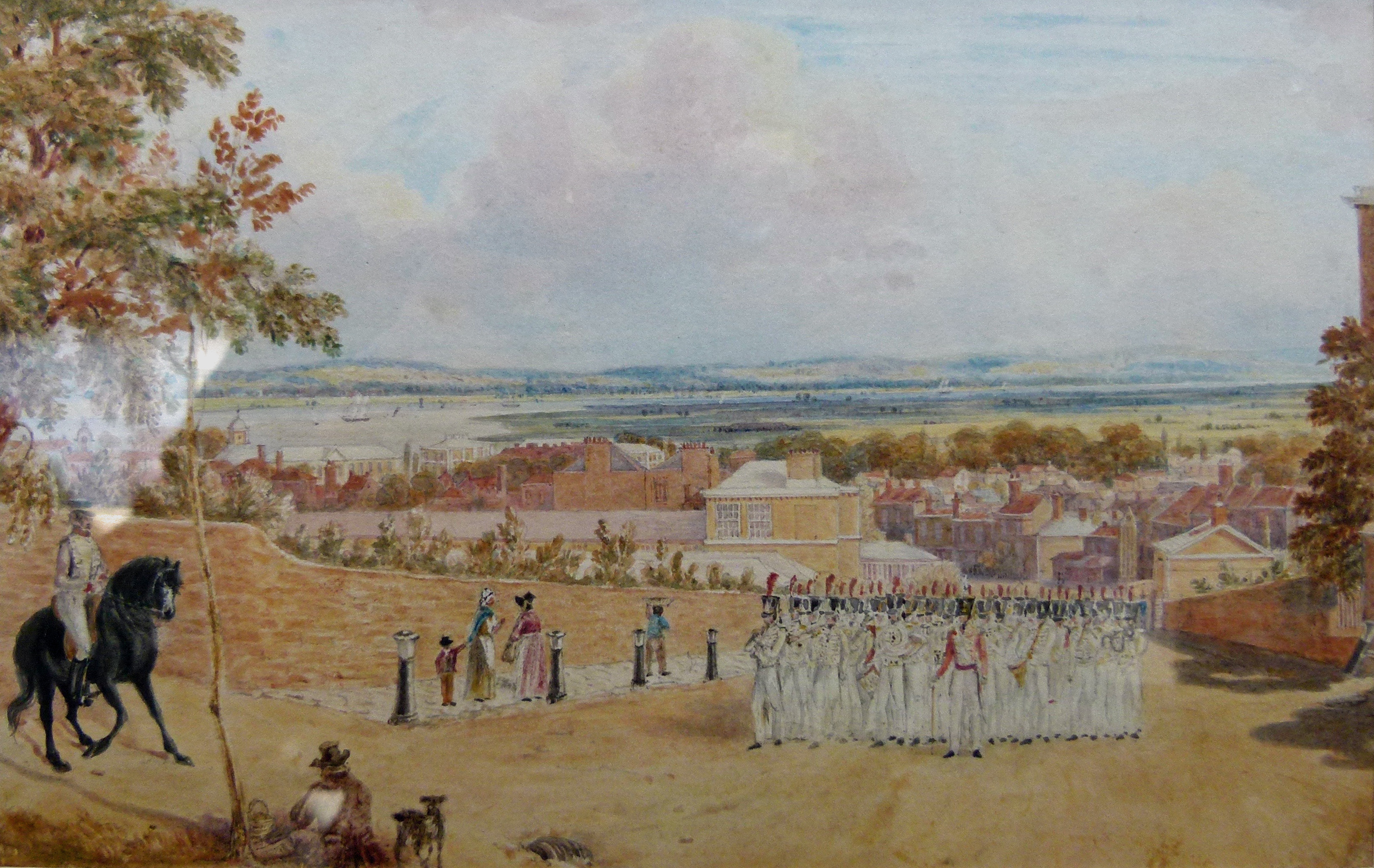
The Royal Artillery Band marching through Woolwich, early 19th century

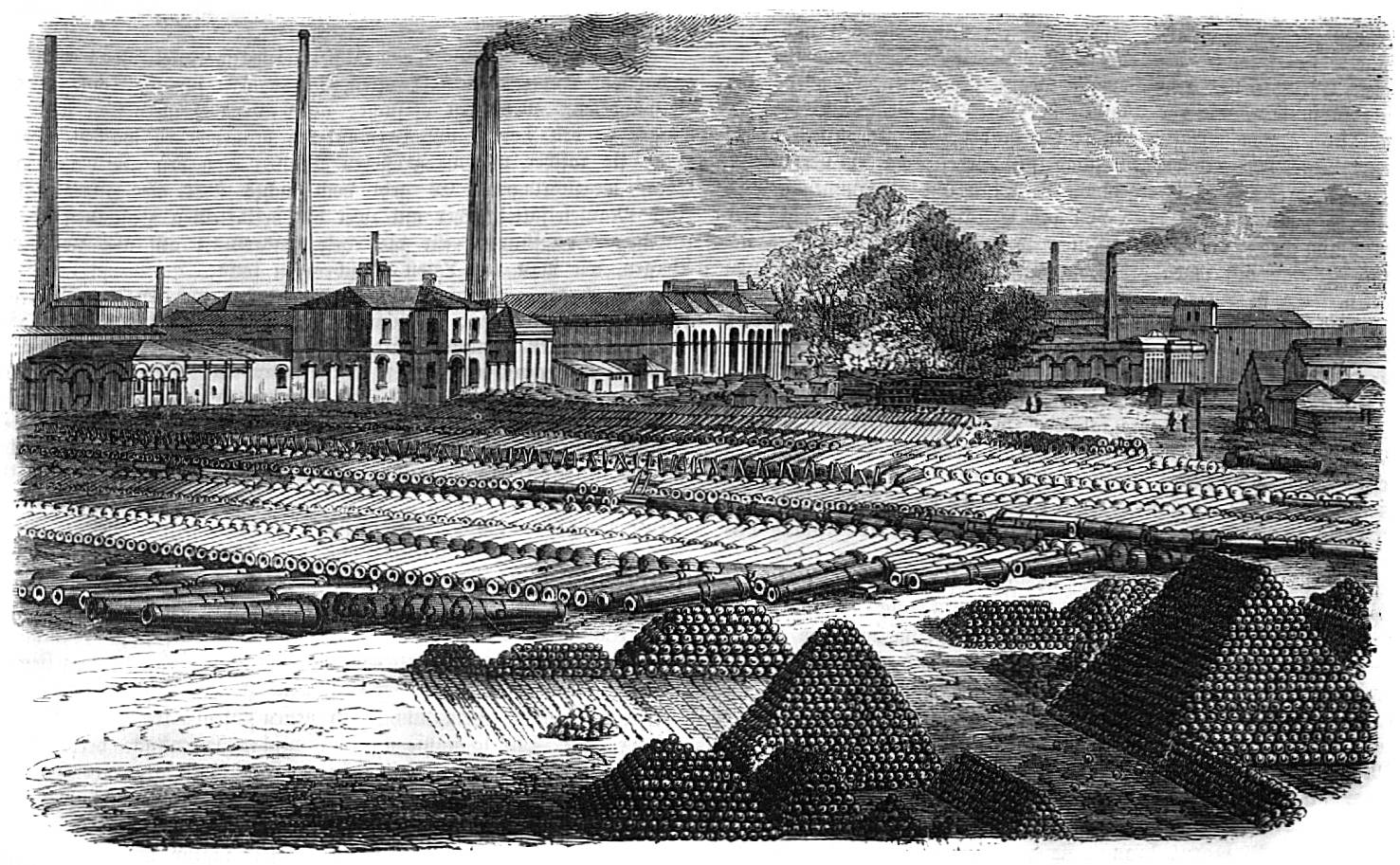
Open-air storage at the Royal Arsenal in the mid-19th century

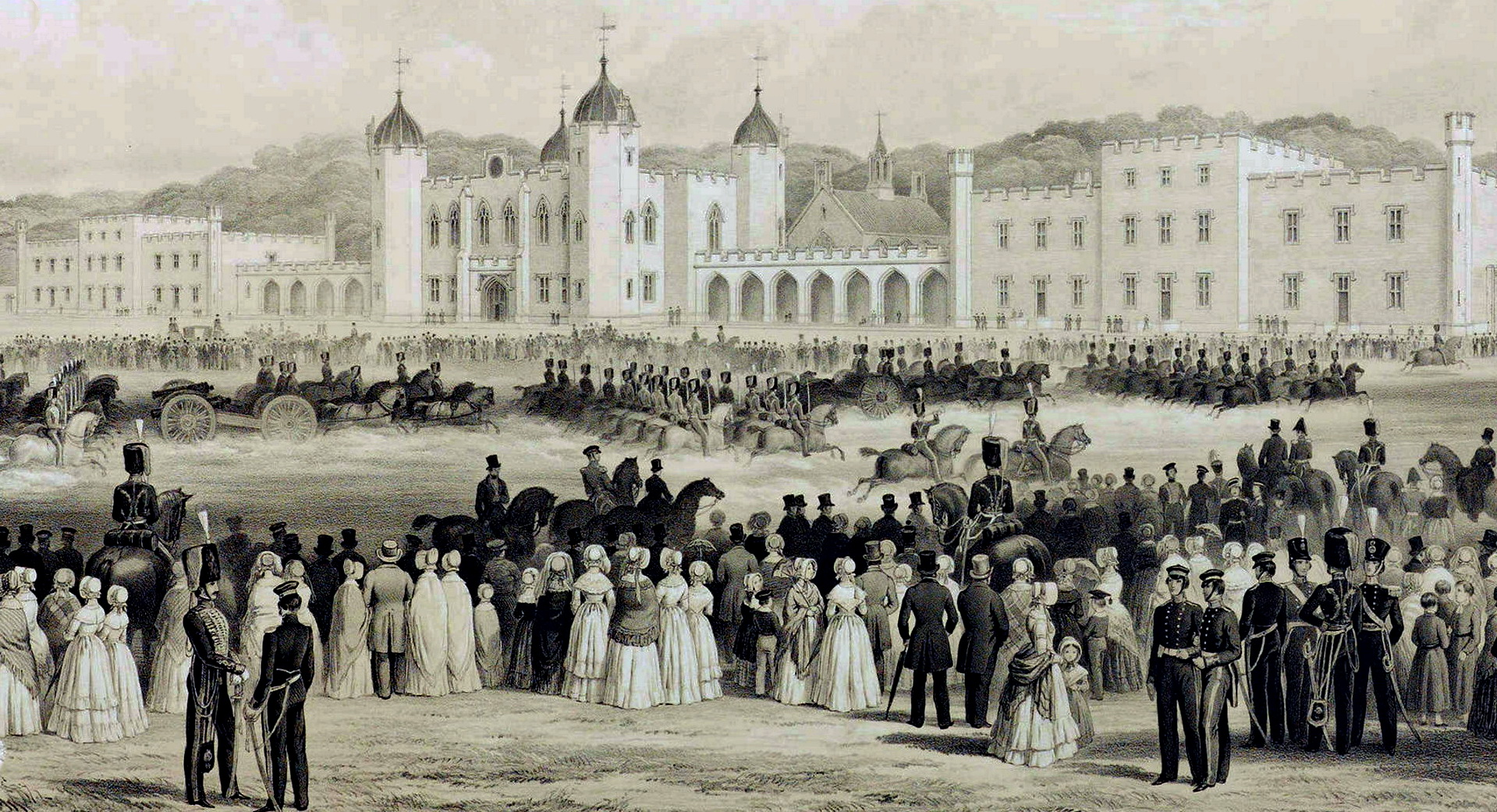
Royal Horse Artillery Review at the Royal Military Academy 1850

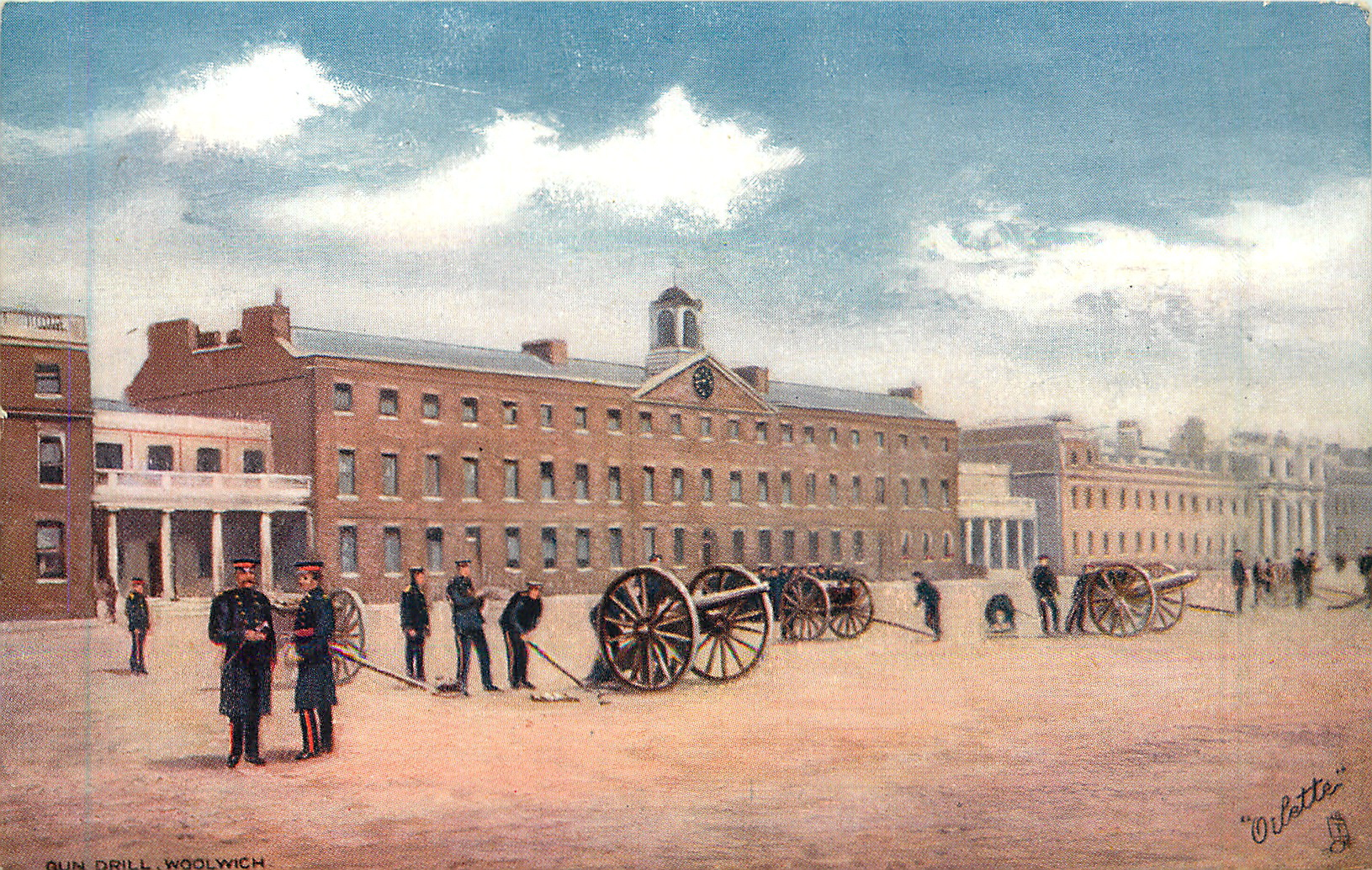
Royal Artillery Barracks, c. 1900

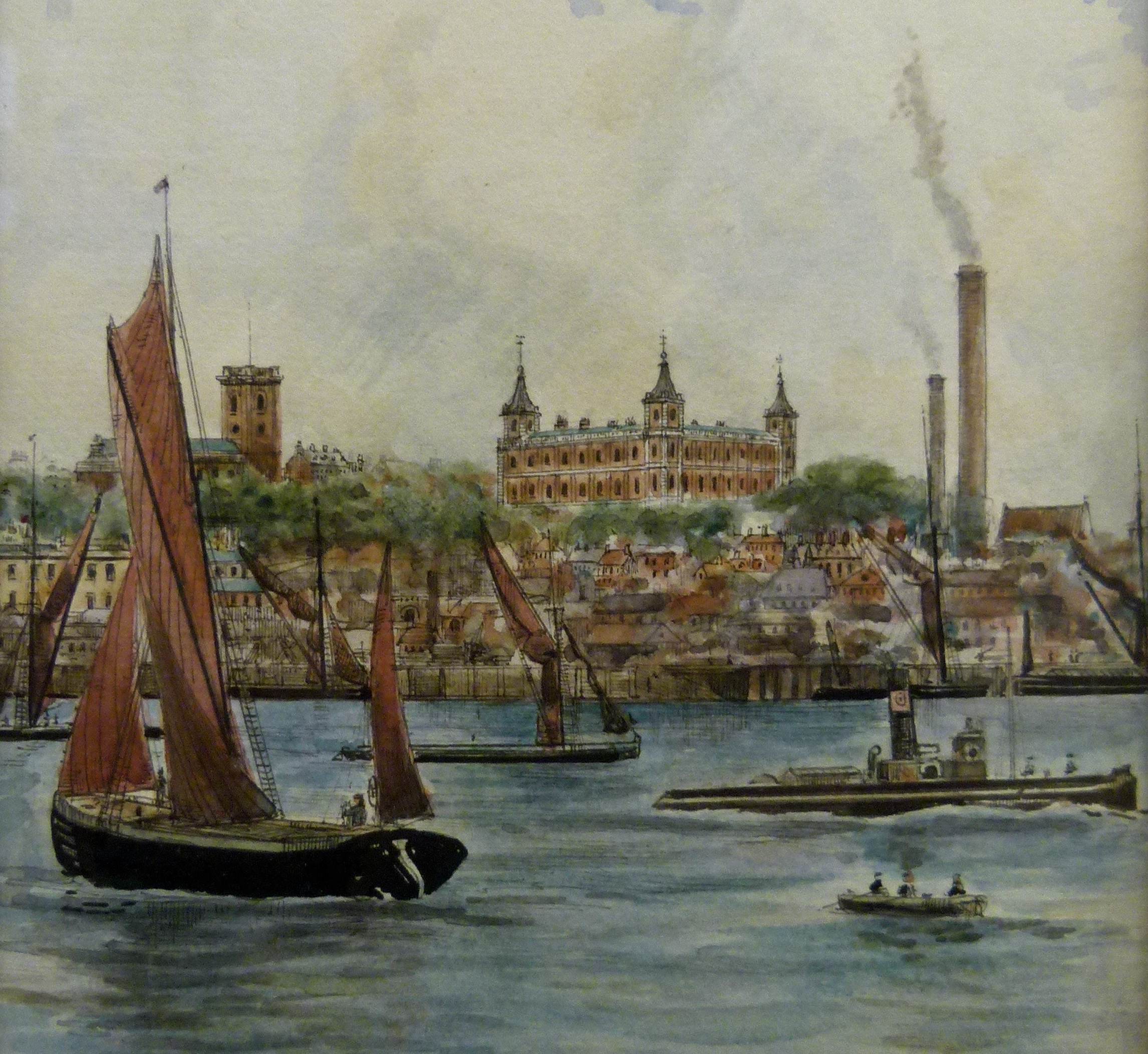
Old Woolwich in 1929. On the hill: the parish church and the Red Barracks.

=== Economic development ===
==== Employment ====
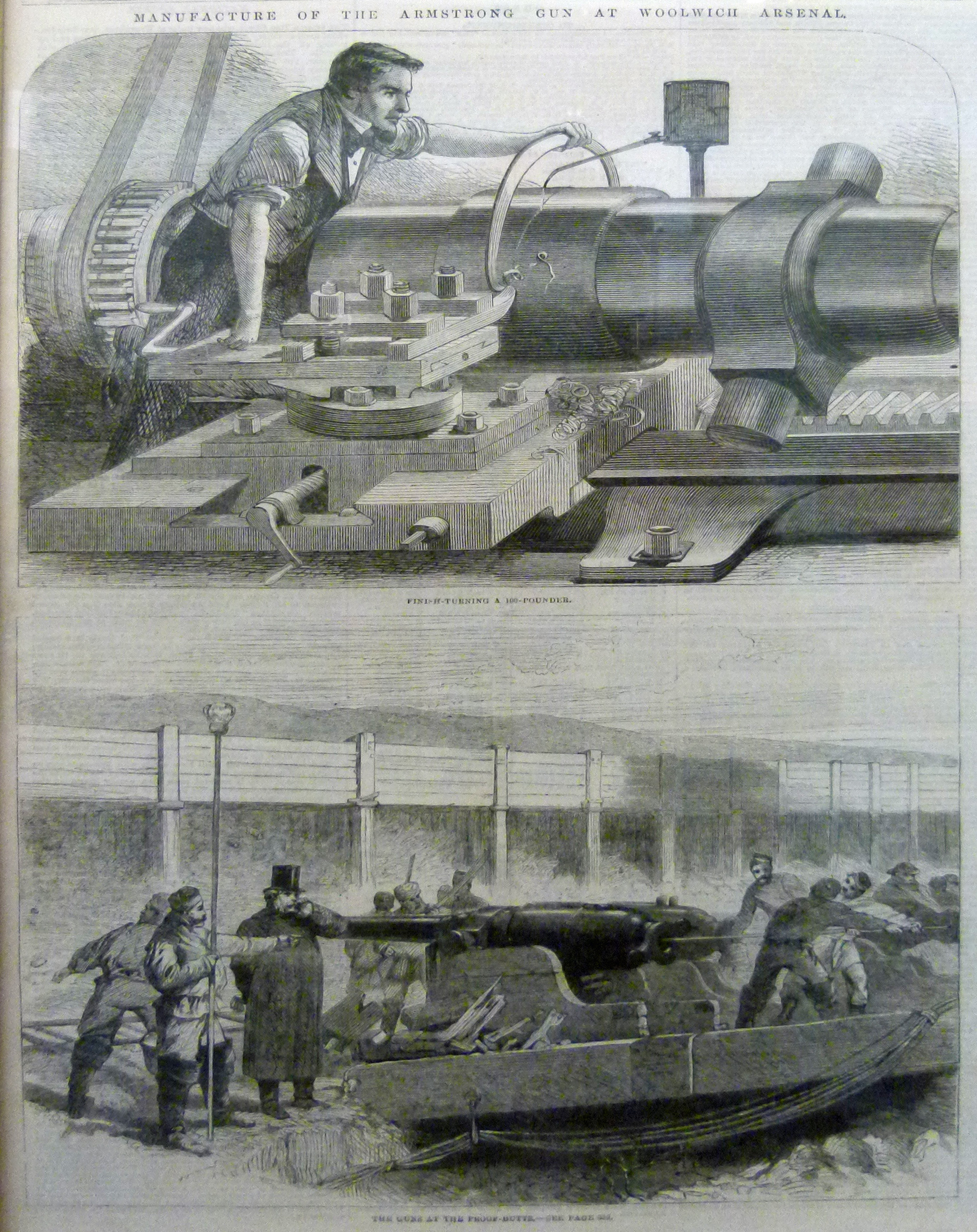
Workers at the Royal Arsenal, 1862

Throughout the 18th century the navy yard remained the town's main employer with between 500 and 1,400 men working in the docks. Due to the malarial marshlands, it was not a popular place to work and for that reason Woolwich dockyard workers were paid as much as a third more than in other naval towns. These were mostly skilled artisans who were generally literate, Nonconformist and well-organized. The number of artillery men grew from around 200 in 1716 to around 1,500 in 1801. Soldiers were generally held in contempt, earning about a quarter of dockyard labourers' wages. At the height of the Napoleonic Wars, there were more soldiers (3,000) than dockyard and ropeyard workers (2,000), while the arsenal employed as many as 5,000. After the end of the wars, thousands were discharged, causing great distress. In the 1840s, a steam factory gave a new lease of life to the dockyard and the 1850s saw a huge expansion of the arsenal during and after the Crimean War.

The presence of the dockyard, the arsenal and other military institutions stimulated economic growth in other areas, notably in commercial activities and entertainment. The ropeyard was established around 1570 and survived until 1832. Throughout the 17th century two glass factories were active near Glass Yard, owned by Sir Robert Mansell from Greenwich, who also managed the dockyard and the ropeyard. Some of the masters here were Huguenots from Lorraine. Kilns producing Bellarmine stoneware may also have been controlled by continental potters. Other kilns produced earthenware and clay pipes. Kilns were also active on the hillside south of the town, where clay was readily available. Near Plumstead and Charlton were sandpits; the sand was shipped from a wharf near Tower Place. In 1863, the German firm Siemens & Halske established a submarine-cable factory in the Dockyard area, which expanded rapidly.

==== Retail ====
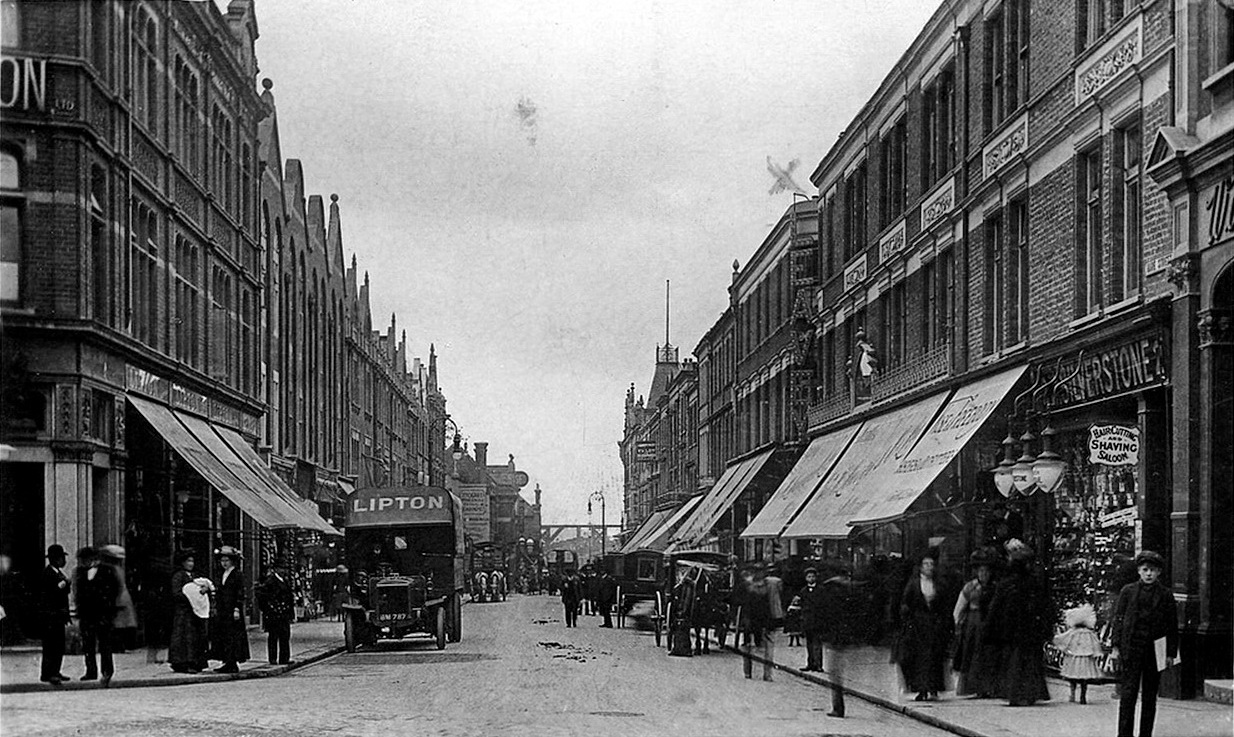
Hare Street in 1911

Woolwich market received its charter in 1618 but is certainly older. The market, which had long been established in the High Street in Old Woolwich (at a location called Market Hill), had gradually drifted towards the Royal Arsenal's main gatehouse, more or less at its present location. This was not approved by the authorities and a new market was set up in the Bathway Quarter around 1810. This proved to be a failure and is remembered only in the name of Market Street. Until 1879, the market at Beresford Square remained illegal and was regularly cleared by the police. After it was legalized, it had room for 136 stalls. Italo Svevo described it as "very lively" in 1903. In 1936, a covered market opened in Plumstead Road but never formed a threat to the main market. Beresford Square had the largest public houses (of which Woolwich had many). Powis Street and Hare Street, laid out in the early 19th century, became the main shopping streets. A number of Victorian shop facades, many designed by local architect Henry Hudson Church, have survived.

In 1868 the Royal Arsenal Co-operative Society was established, which developed into one of the biggest consumer cooperatives in the country with two department stores in Powis Street, shops around South East London, manufacturing and food production plants, a building society, a funeral service and many other areas of entrepreneurship.

=== Urban development ===
==== Population ====
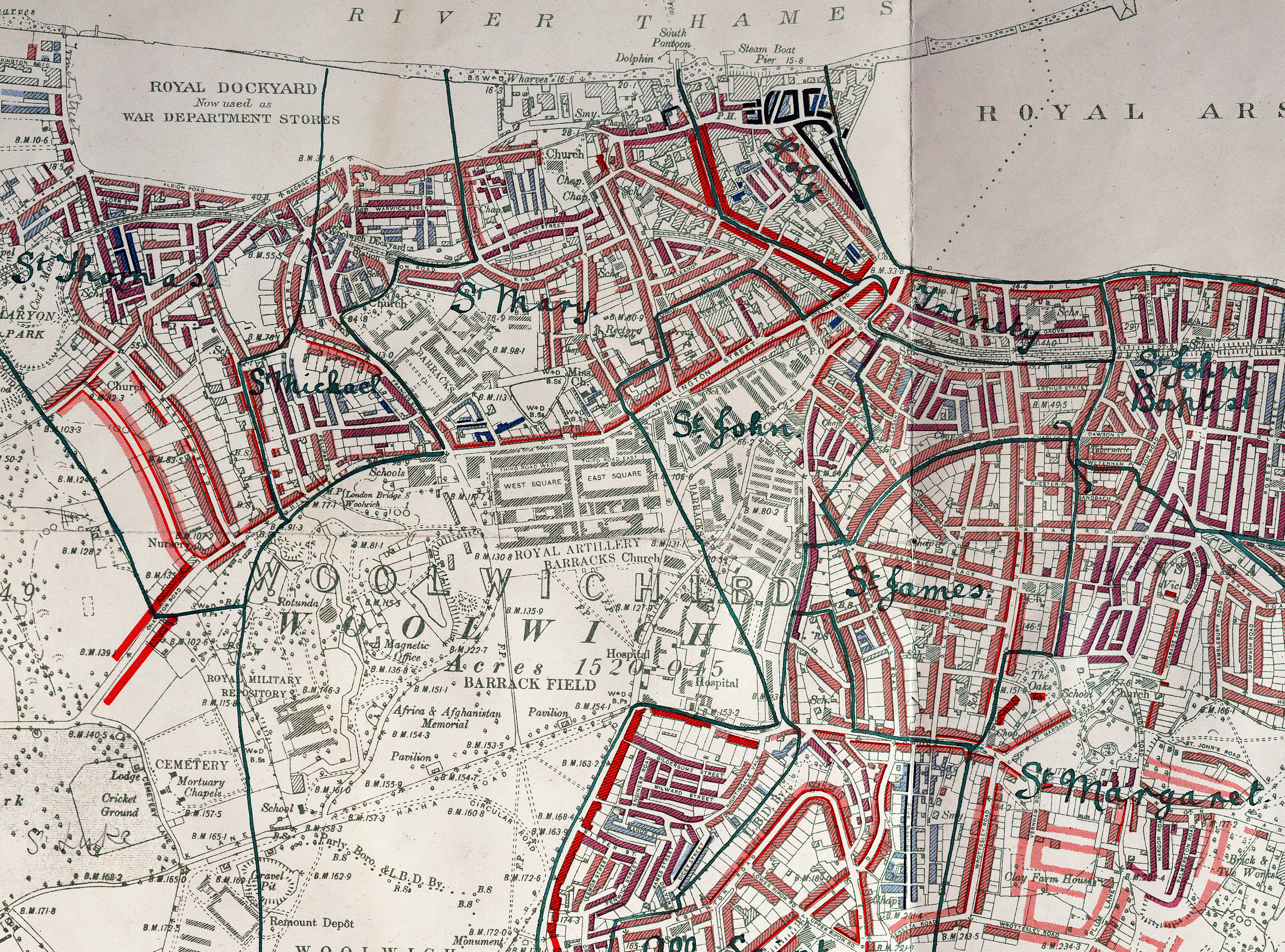
Poverty map of Woolwich, 1889. The areas in black designate the "lowest class, vicious, semi-criminals". Bright red is "middle class, well-to-do".

Around 1500, at the beginning of the military and naval expansion, Woolwich had only a few hundred inhabitants. In 1665, when Samuel Pepys stayed here to escape the Great Plague, the population was estimated at 1,200 or more, of which about 300 worked in the dockyard. Around 1720, the town's population had risen to 6,500, reaching almost 10,000 in 1801. During the booming wartime decade that followed, population reached a peak of 17,000. After a period of stagnation, building activity picked up in the 1830s. Woolwich's built-up area expanded southward with workers' houses mostly close to the river and officers' houses around Woolwich Common and further up the hill. In 1841 Woolwich had a population of 27,785; in 1861 this had risen to 41,695. At this point there were 4,596 houses in the parish, with little space left for building; further development took place in Plumstead, Charlton and North Woolwich, later also in Eltham. After a dip in the late 19th century, in 1901 the population of the parish of Woolwich stood at the same level as 40 years earlier: 41,625. Victorian Woolwich was a rich social mix with skilled engineers along with unskilled labourers (including women and children) working at the Arsenal and other factories, large numbers of soldiers (making up 10–15% of the population) and a small bourgeoisie consisting of military officers and the commercial and professional elite. Some areas of the town were notoriously overcrowded; the so-called Dusthole near the river was considered one of London's worst slums.

==== Infrastructure ====
Until the arrival of the railways, the Thames was the principal artery connecting Woolwich to London. In 1834 the Woolwich Steam Packet Company greatly improved river traffic and in 1889 the Woolwich Free Ferry made it easier to live in North Woolwich and work in the Arsenal, or to live in Woolwich and work in the Docklands. The North Kent Line from London via Greenwich and Woolwich to Gillingham opened in 1849. The station building was rebuilt in 1906 and again in 1992–93. Woolwich was also on the route of two London trams of the first generation (1881–1952).

The post-war period brought massive changes to the town's fabric and infrastructure. Roads were widened and entire neighbourhoods pulled down to make room for modern housing, some of it in tower blocks. The widening of Woolwich High Street and Beresford Street left little of the old town. Woolwich was home to the experimental Auto Stacker car park. Built on the site of the Empire Theatre, it was officially opened in May 1961 by Princess Margaret. It never actually worked and was demolished in 1962. A multi-storey car park was built along Monk Street in 1971.

==== Education ====
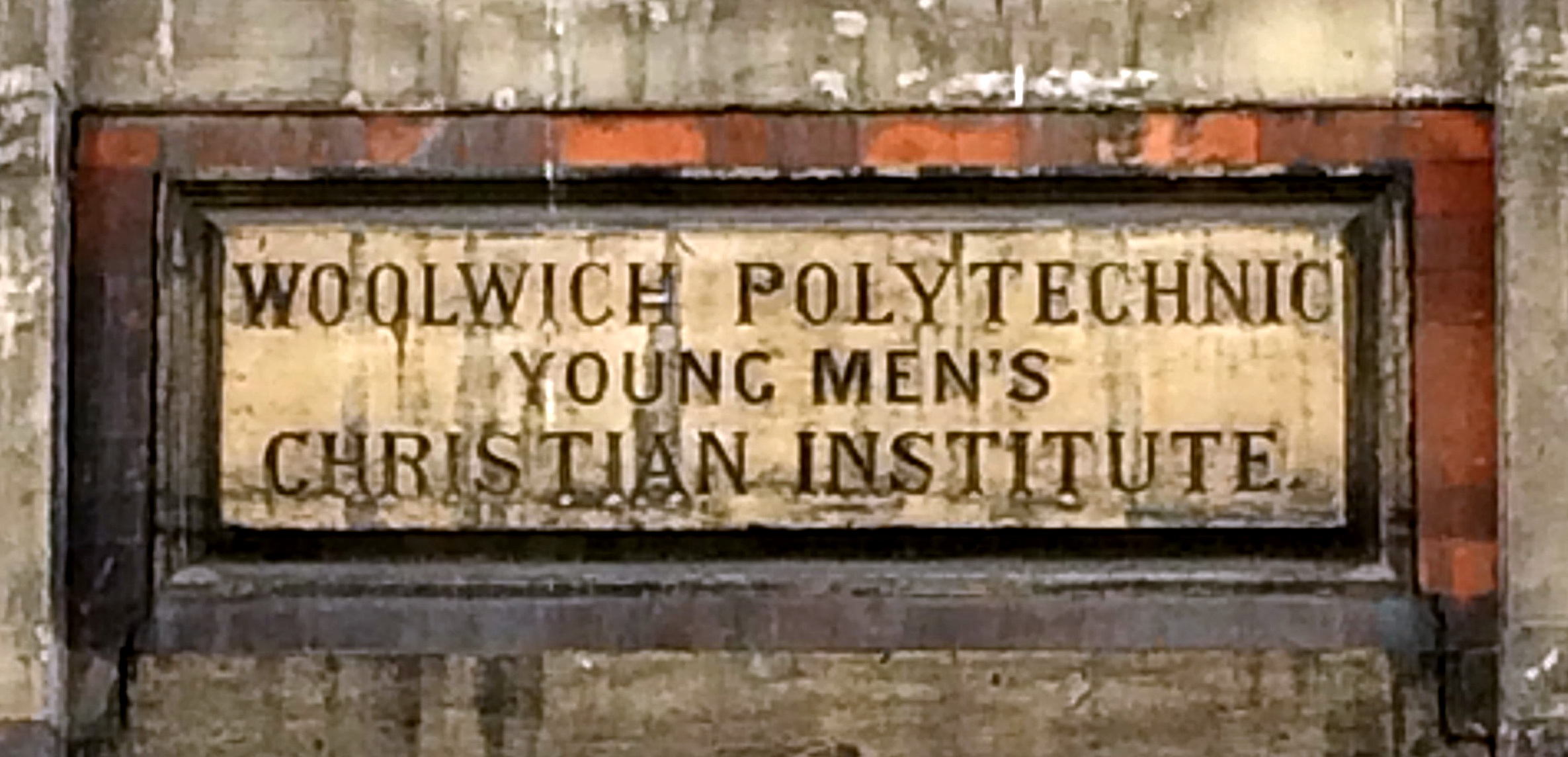
Woolwich Polytechnic, 1891

Woolwich Polytechnic was founded in 1891. As well as providing a higher education facility, it also provided secondary school facilities, including the still-extant (but now relocated) Woolwich Polytechnic School for Boys. In the 20th century the Polytechnic grew steadily, taking up almost an entire block in the Bathway Quarter and later spreading to other areas. In 1970 it merged with other local colleges and became Thames Polytechnic. In 1992 it was granted university status and a year later was renamed the University of Greenwich. In 2001, the university relocated to the Old Royal Naval College in Greenwich, leaving only a small administrative presence in Woolwich.

Woolwich was the location of the first free kindergarten in the UK. The Woolwich Mission Kindergarten opened in 1900, and began in a room provided by a Christian socialist vicar of Holy Trinity church in New Charlton, the Rev. Walter Wragge. It was founded by his sister, Adelaide Wragge, the Fröbel-influenced principal of Blackheath Kindergarten Training College.

==== Leisure ====
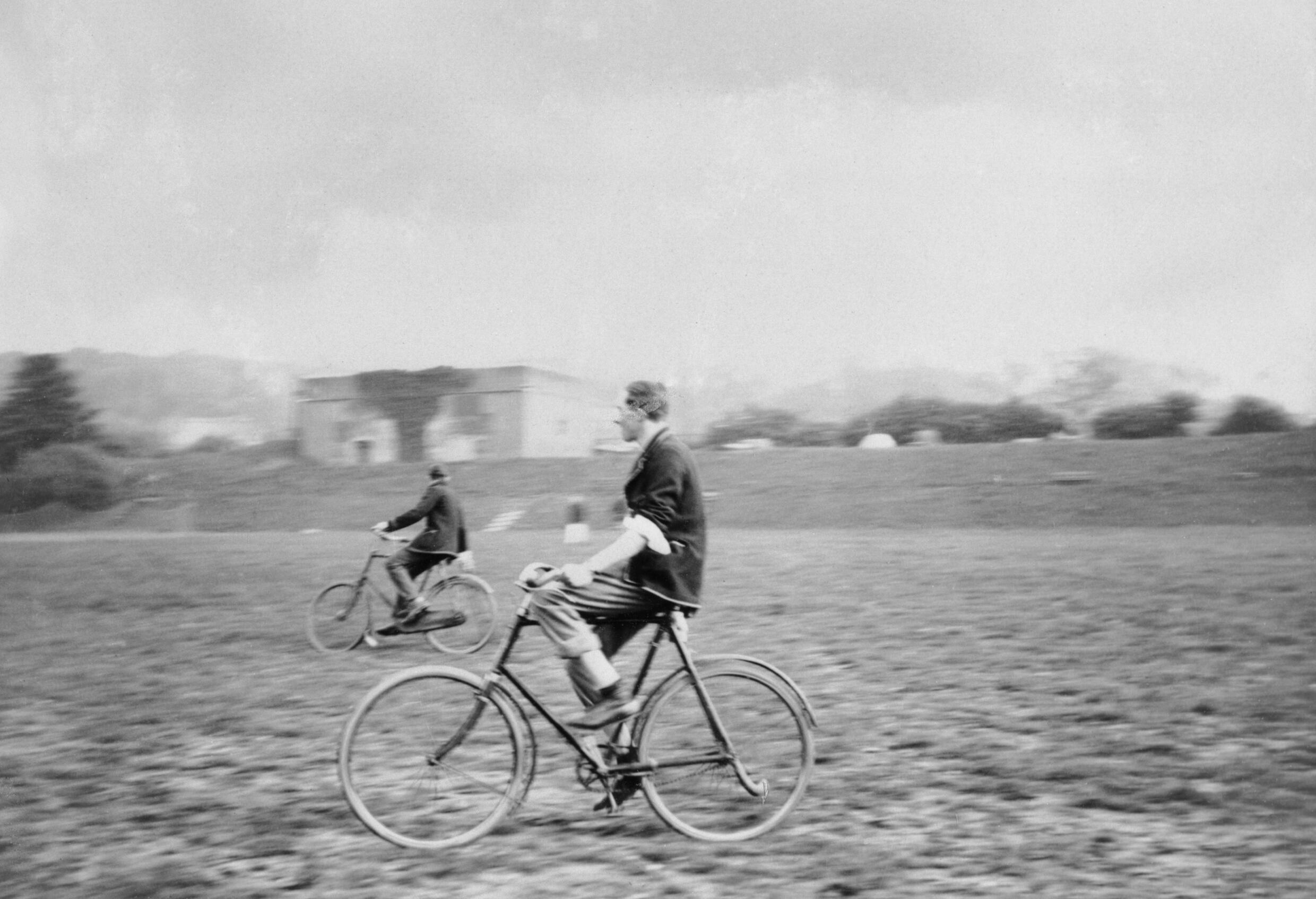
Officers of the Royal Artillery playing polo on bicycles, c. 1910

In the 18th century, Woolwich Cricket Club, later Royal Artillery Cricket Club, were well-known cricket clubs. Cricket and other sports were mainly played by military officers and students at the Royal Military Academy. Arsenal F.C. was founded in 1886 by workers at the Royal Arsenal. Initially known as Dial Square, then Royal Arsenal and then Woolwich Arsenal, they soon drew large crowds to their ground in Plumstead. In 1913 they moved to Arsenal Stadium in Highbury, North London. Royal Ordnance Factories F.C. was founded in response to Woolwich Arsenal joining the League but only lasted a few years.

Woolwich had several theatres and cinemas. The Theatre Royal in Beresford Street, later renamed Empire Theatre or Woolwich Empire, was the biggest. Dating from the 1830s, it was enlarged in the 1880s and 1890s, seating about 2,000. It both served as a variety theater and cinema, ending up as a strip-joint. It was demolished in 1960. Shortly after 1900, three new theaters opened with a combined capacity of 4,430. The Century cinema, which faced Beresford Square, was previously known as Premier Cinema and Royal Arsenal Cinema. It was built in 1913 with 669 seats, closed in 1961 and demolished for redevelopment in the late 1960s. The Grand Theatre in Wellington Street opened in 1900 as a variety theatre with a capacity of 1,680. It became the Woolwich Hippodrome in 1908 and a full-time cinema in 1923. Rebuilt in 1955 as the Regal Cinema, it closed in 1982, was then used as a nightclub and demolished in 2015. The Granada cinema and the Odeon, later Coronet, both seating around 2,500, are imposing buildings from the 1930s that have both been converted into Pentecostal churches.

==== Local government ====
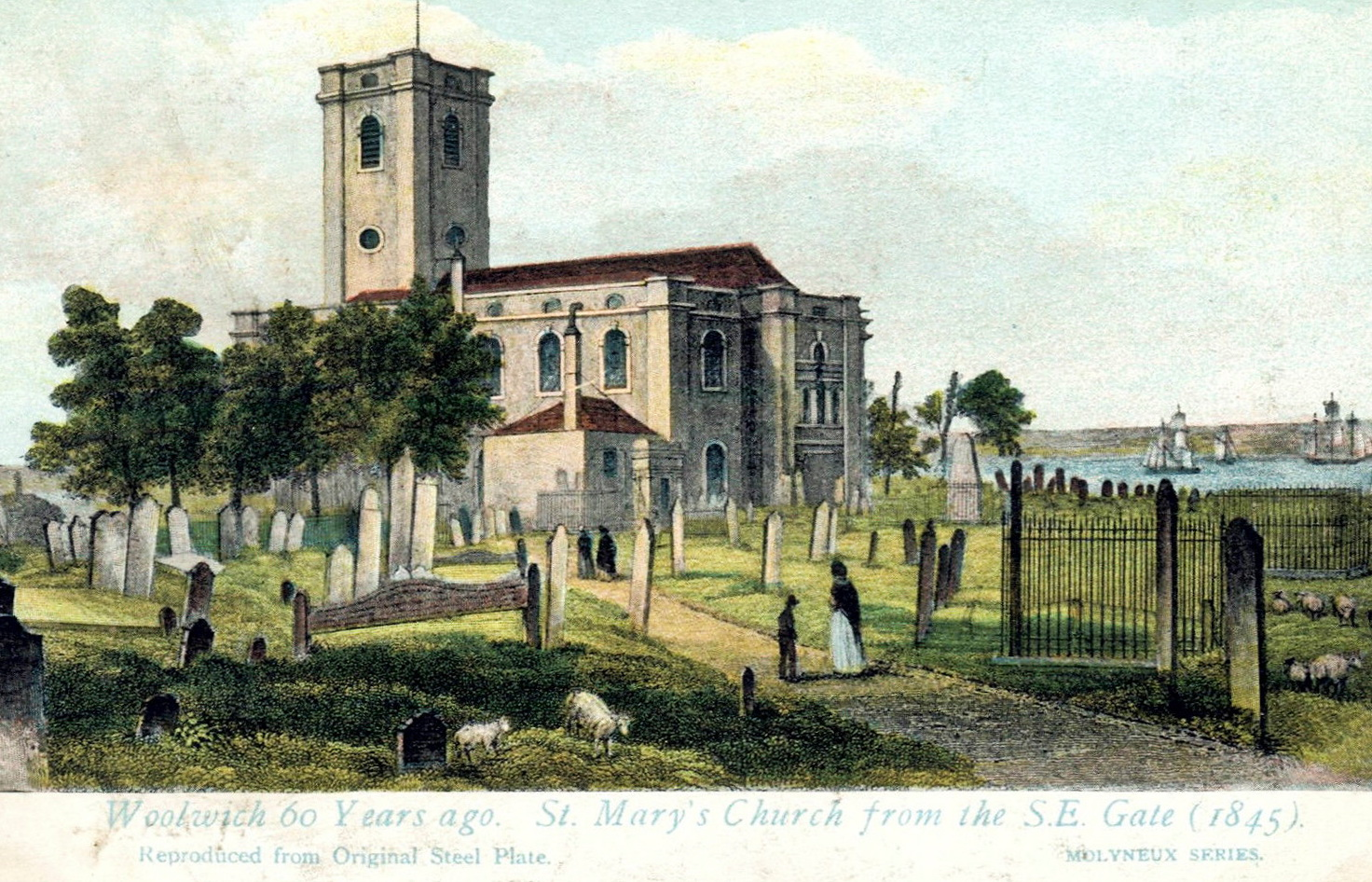
St Mary Magdalene c. 1840

The civil parish of Woolwich, roughly the area of the present-day wards Woolwich Riverside and Woolwich Common, was formerly known as Woolwich Saint Mary. Until 1842, when the Old Town Hall was built, the vestry met in a room in the parish church of St Mary Magdalene. Woolwich became part of the London metropolitan area in the mid-19th century, although it was officially still in Kent at the time. In 1889, with the formation of London County Council, Woolwich became officially part of London. In 1900 the parishes of Woolwich, Eltham and Plumstead formed the Metropolitan Borough of Woolwich. In 1906 the new Woolwich Town Hall was inaugurated. In April 1965, following implementation of the London Government Act 1963, Woolwich was merged into the London Borough of Greenwich, since 2012 the Royal Borough of Greenwich. The administrative buildings of the borough are in Woolwich, at the former Woolwich Town Hall.

Woolwich St Mary
- Civil parish
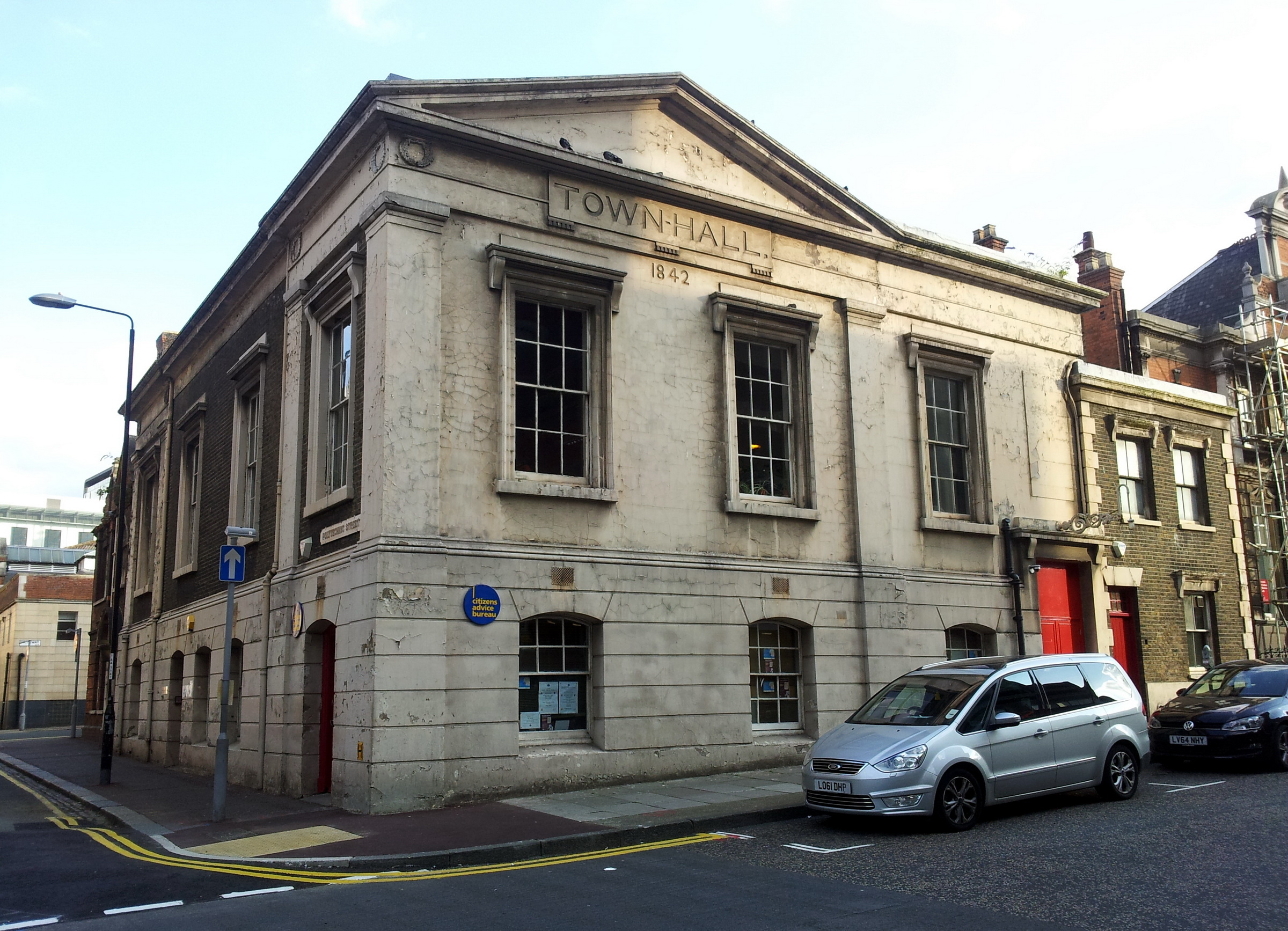
- Woolwich Old Town Hall (1842)
- Area
  - 1881: 1,126 acres (4.56 km^{2})
  - Coordinates: 51.4930°N 0.0592°E
- Population
  - 1881: 36,665
- History
  - Origin: Ancient parish
  - Created: 16th century
  - Abolished: 1930
  - Succeeded by: Borough of Woolwich (parish)
- Status: Civil parish (16th century–1930); Local board district (1852–1900)
- Government: Woolwich Vestry (16th century–1852); Woolwich Local Board of Health (1852–1900)
  - HQ: Church of St Mary (16th century–1842); Woolwich Old Town Hall (1842–1900)
- Contained within
  - Poor Law Union: Greenwich (1836–1868); Woolwich (1868–1930)

Woolwich, also known as Woolwich St Mary, was an ancient parish on the south bank of the Thames and North Woolwich on the north bank. The parish was governed by its vestry from the 16th century to 1852, based in the Church of St Mary until 1842, after which in the purpose-built Woolwich Town Hall. The parish adopted the Public Health Act 1848 (11 & 12 Vict. c. 63) and was governed by the Woolwich Local Board of Health from 1852. When the parish became part of the district of the Metropolitan Board of Works in 1855 the local board was treated as if it were an incorporated vestry. It was in the county of Kent until it was transferred to London in 1889. In 1900 it was amalgamated with other parishes to form the Metropolitan Borough of Woolwich and had only nominal existence until it was abolished as a civil parish in 1930. Since 1965 it has been split between the Royal Borough of Greenwich and the London Borough of Newham.

===== Geography =====
The main part of the parish was a roughly triangular area south of the River Thames, including the town of Woolwich. The boundary with Plumstead to the east was very close to the centre of the town, located approximately where the Woolwich Arsenal station is now. The parish narrowed further south, including Woolwich Common and reaching to Shooter's Hill Road. The western boundary at this point was with Charlton Common in the parish of Charlton. North of the Thames the parish included two nearby sections of land known as North Woolwich. The western part was divided from the eastern section by the parish of East Ham. The eastern section stretched to the River Roding and had a boundary with the parish of Barking. The former area of the parish is now part of the Royal Borough of Greenwich to the south of the River Thames and the London Borough of Newham to the north.

===== Governance =====
The Parliamentary Boundaries Act 1832, which transferred county exclaves to their local counties for election of members of parliament, explicitly treated the North Woolwich area as part of Kent. The Counties (Detached Parts) Act 1844, applied the 1832 designations for all civil purposes.

The parish became part of the Greenwich Poor Law Union in 1836 and then the Woolwich Poor Law Union from 1868.

Woolwich was added to the Registrar General definition of the London Metropolis in 1837, appearing in the weekly tables of mortality from 1840. The parish was added to the Metropolitan Police District in 1840.

The vestry built a town hall, now known as the Old Town Hall in 1842.

The parish adopted the Public Health Act 1848 (11 & 12 Vict. c. 63) and a local board was formed in 1852, consisting of eighteen elected members and three nominated members.

In 1855 the parish was included in the district of the Metropolitan Board of Works. It was an anomaly amongst metropolitan parishes, having a local board of health, and this was treated as if it were an incorporated vestry.

Following the Local Government Act 1888, the parish was transferred from the County of Kent to the County of London in 1889.

Elsewhere in England, following the Local Government Act 1894, local boards of health became urban district councils. The Woolwich Local Board of Health continued to exist until 1900 when, as part of the provisions of the London Government Act 1899, the parish was combined with Eltham and Plumstead to form the Metropolitan Borough of Woolwich.

The parish continued to exist for election of a board of guardians, but was abolished for this purpose in 1930. The parishes in the Borough of Woolwich were then combined into a single parish.

===== Politics =====
From 1832 the more urbanised northern part of the parish was in the parliamentary borough of Greenwich with the southern part of the parish in the West Kent division. In 1885 the whole parish was included as part of the Woolwich constituency. In 1918 it was split, with the parish of Woolwich mostly becoming part of Woolwich West, with a small part in Woolwich East.

===== Population =====
The population at the decennial census was:

| Year | 1801 | 1811 | 1821 | 1831 | 1841 | 1851 | 1861 | 1871 | 1881 | 1891 | 1901 | 1911 |
|---|---|---|---|---|---|---|---|---|---|---|---|---|
| Population | 9,826 | 17,054 | 17,008 | 17,661 | 25,785 | 32,367 | 41,695 | 35,557 | 36,665 | 40,848 | 41,625 | 36,710 |

=== Post-war history ===
==== Decline ====
Woolwich declined as a town in the late 20th century, starting with the closure of the Royal Ordnance Factory in 1967 and the Siemens factory in 1968 and continuing as the Royal Arsenal scaled back operations and finally closed in 1994. Other employers like the Woolwich Building Society ("The Woolwich") and Morgan Grampian Publishers were taken over by other companies and moved away from the town. Without major employers, the local economy was affected and unemployment soared. At the same time the town's demographics changed, with initially mainly Sikhs settling down in the area, later followed by black Africans, many from Nigeria. Despite immigration, the population of the parish reached a low of 17,000 in 1971. In general, Woolwich had lost its previous vigour. In the town's shopping district, department stores and chain stores closed. By the early 1990s, the town centre had the typical appearance of a town in decline with discount retailers and charity shops using the empty stores and Greenwich Council occupying the empty office buildings. In 1974, the United Kingdom's first branch of McDonald's opened in Powis Street. Amidst the decline, Woolwich was still considered to be a representative English town at the time.

In 1974 the Provisional IRA bombed the Kings Arms pub in the town. The bombing killed two. During the 2011 England riots, Woolwich was one of the areas affected. Several buildings were attacked, with a few being destroyed. The Great Harry Wetherspoons' Pub was set on fire, though it was subsequently remodeled and reopened. On 22 May 2013 the murder of Lee Rigby in Woolwich caused upheaval. Drummer Lee Rigby, a British soldier based at the Royal Artillery Barracks, was murdered close to the barracks by two Islamic extremists.

The 16th Regiment Royal Artillery left Woolwich in 2007, but the Woolwich barracks still house the Royal Artillery Band and more recently the Second Battalion Princess of Wales' Royal Regiment and the King's Troop, Royal Horse Artillery, although the relocation of these has been announced for 2028.

==== Regeneration ====
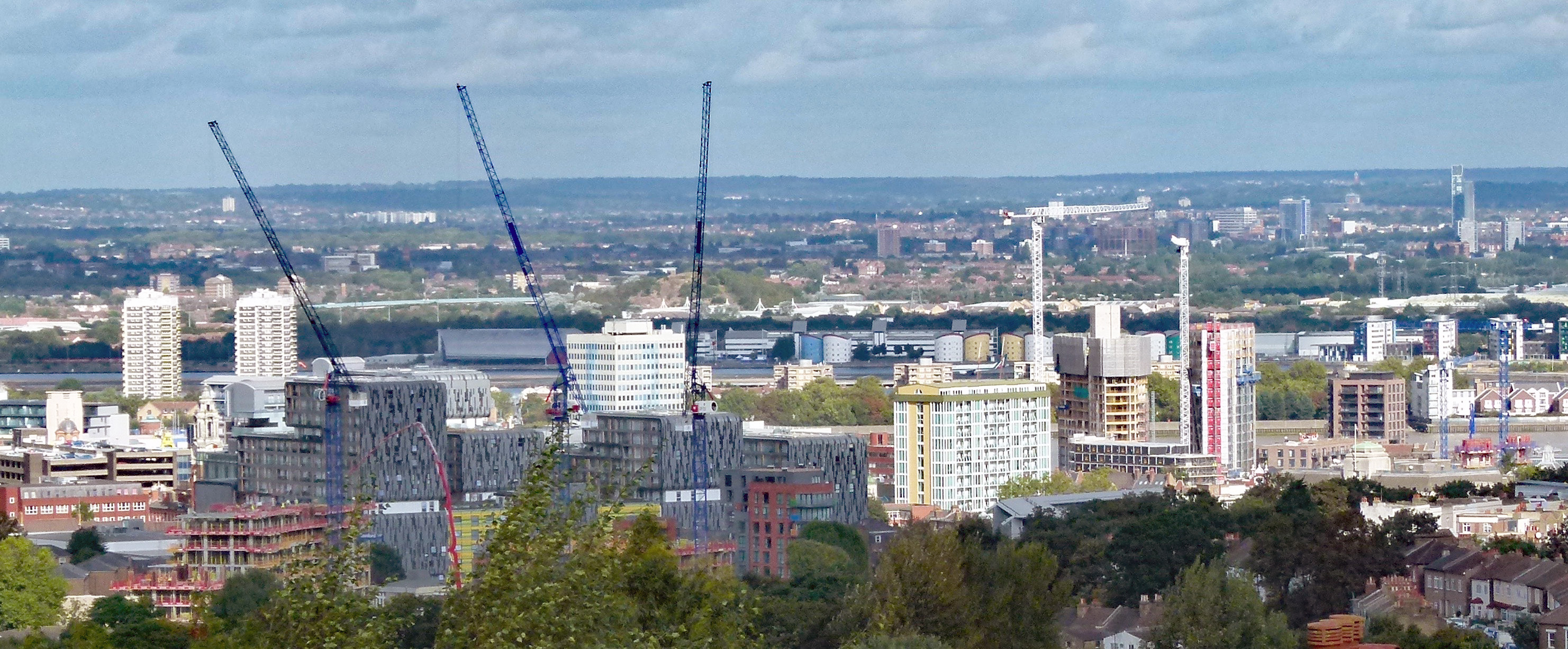
Construction sites in Woolwich (Shooter's Hill view, 2016)

Recent and anticipated regeneration in the area means that it is expected that the district, identified in the London Plan as "opportunity area", is expected to evolve from "major centre" to "metropolitan centre" within Greater London in the next few decades.

Woolwich started to enjoy the beginning of a renaissance with the residential redevelopment of the former Royal Arsenal. Most historic buildings on the site have been renovated and converted into apartments. Several thousands of homes have been built or are under construction and thousands more are planned, mainly luxury apartments in tower blocks near the river. Additionally, a riverside walk, several parks, a museum, a range of shops, cafés, pubs and restaurants, and a farmers' market have made the Arsenal a desirable place to live. In 2017 it was announced that the borough has acquired five historic buildings around No 1 Street to create a £31 million creative district. It will feature a 1,200-seat auditorium for concerts and events, a performance courtyard that seats up to 600, a 450-seat black box theatre and a riverside restaurant. The Greenwich Heritage Centre will move to new premises. The site will further include offices, studios and rehearsal spaces for resident companies such as Academy Performing Arts, Dash Arts, Chickenshed Theatre, Protein Dance, Greenwich Dance and Greenwich+Docklands International Festival. The creative district opened as Woolwich Works in September 2021.

Woolwich Arsenal DLR station, the terminus of the Docklands Light Railway's London City Airport branch, opened on 10 January 2009. The 2012 Summer Olympics and Paralympics included Woolwich as a venue for shooting events, held in temporary facilities constructed on the grounds of the Royal Artillery Barracks and on Woolwich Common.

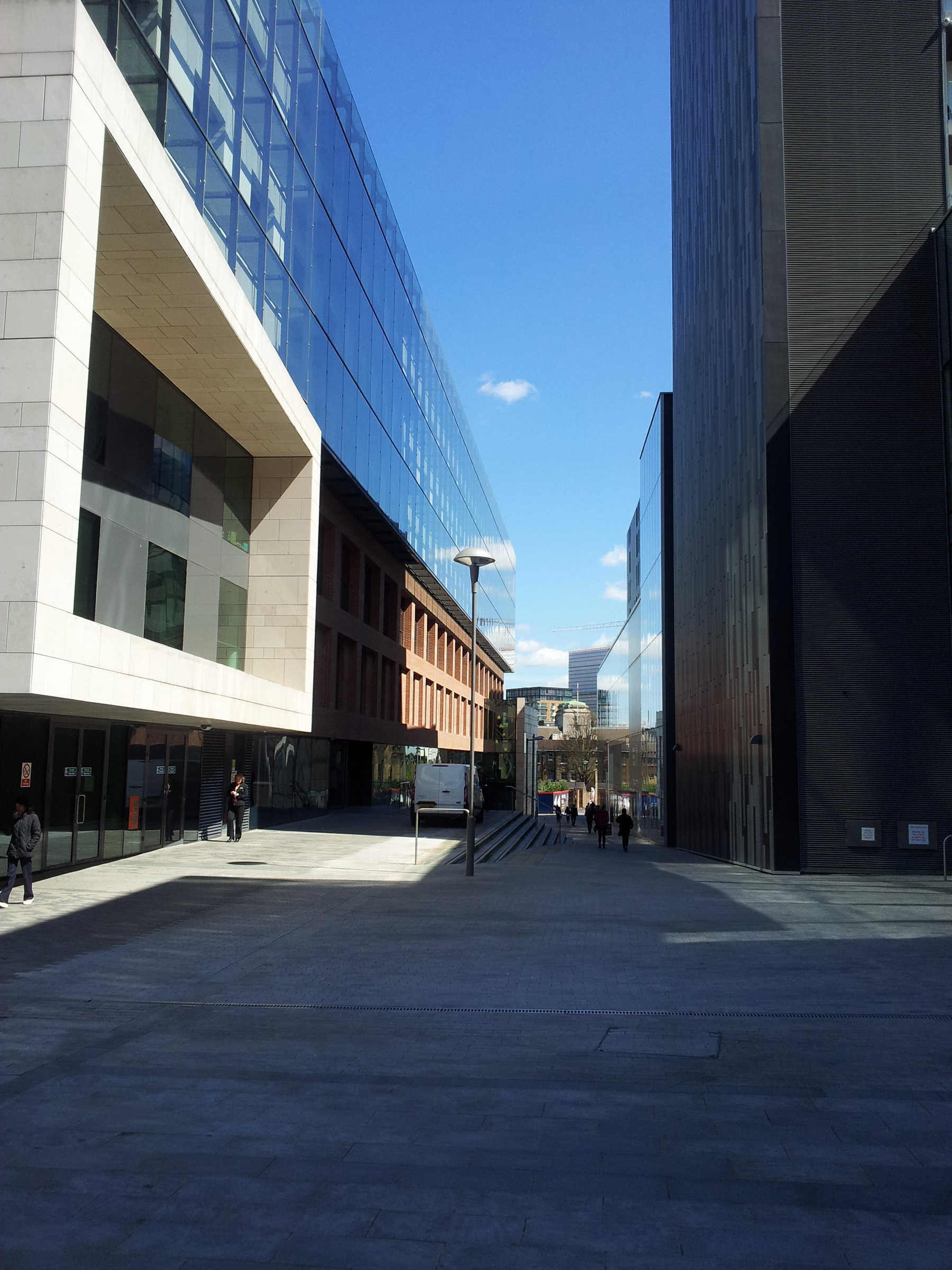
Love Lane development

A large-scale redevelopment of the area west of General Gordon Square started in 2011. The square was re-landscaped, including a new water feature. The so-called Love Lane project involved demolition of several buildings including the Post Office, the Crown Building, the Director General public house, Peggy Middleton House and Thomas Spencer Halls of Residence. New buildings in the first phases of the Woolwich Central redevelopment included: the Woolwich Centre along Wellington Street (public library and council offices, completed in 2011), and a 259-home housing development with an 84,000 ft^{2} (7,800 m^{2}) Tesco hypermarket, completed in 2014. In the same year, the latter development was named Britain's worst new building, being awarded the 'Carbuncle Cup' for a design judges described as "oppressive, defensive, arrogant and inept". The same development was later the subject of a £46.7m claim by Tesco against Willmott Dixon for cladding replacement; Willmott Dixon then sought to reclaim the same amount from its supply chain; When the case was heard in February 2023, two suppliers countered by saying the problems arose due to Willmott Dixon's negligence. The financial impact of the Woolwich Central project continued to be felt in July 2024, when Willmott Dixon said costs to fix the scheme had risen from £44m to £48m.

On the other side of General Gordon Square the 1930s Woolwich Equitable building was refurbished. Next to Woolwich Town Hall on Wellington Street, the 1950s Woolwich Grand Theatre (formerly the ABC Regal Cinema, then Flamingo's Nightclub) briefly reopened as an arts centre with a cafe but in 2015 the building was demolished to make room for apartments.

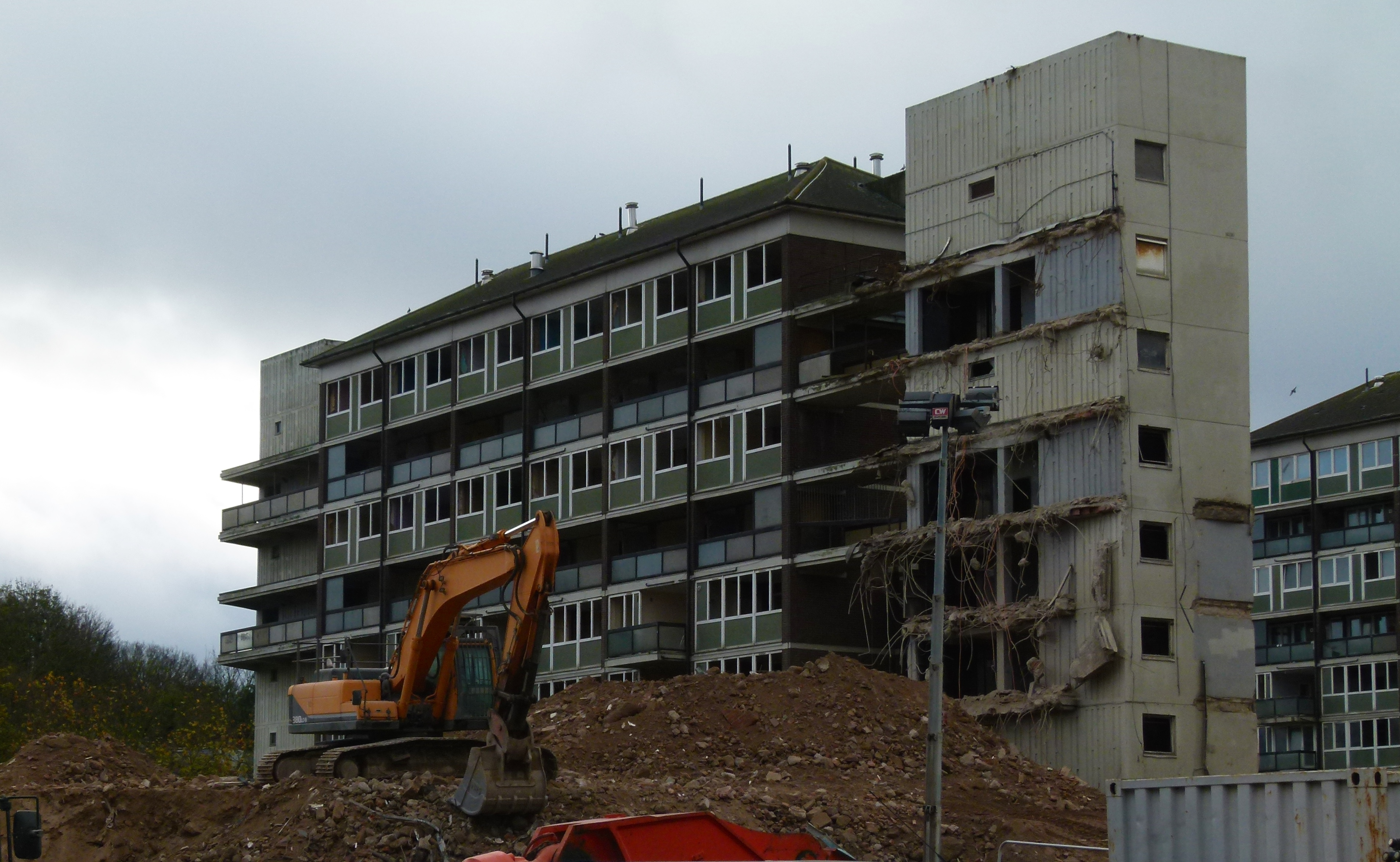
Demolition of Connaught Estate, 2015

Redevelopment around the "Woolwich Triangle" at the west end of Powis Street is partly underway. It originally envisaged demolition of the art deco RACS department store, one of two imposing Co-op buildings in this part of town. In September 2012 Greenwich Council approved a plan to convert the building into apartments and retail. Across the road, the late Victorian former RACS Central Stores building was renovated and re-opened as a hotel. Further regeneration is centred on Hare Street and the Riverside. By relocating the Waterfront Leisure Centre, it is hoped that this part of Woolwich will attract new development. Other areas for redevelopment include Trinity Walk (former Connaught Estate, part of the One Woolwich masterplan for three housing estates), several sites along Wellington Street (including the Ogilby site and the so-called Island site), the Spray Street Quarter (between the existing station and the new Crossrail station), the Callis Yard site (former council stables) and the Electricity Works site south of Beresford Street. Redevelopment plans for the Spray Street Quarter in 2018 included a proposal to demolish the 1936 market hall.

== Heritage ==
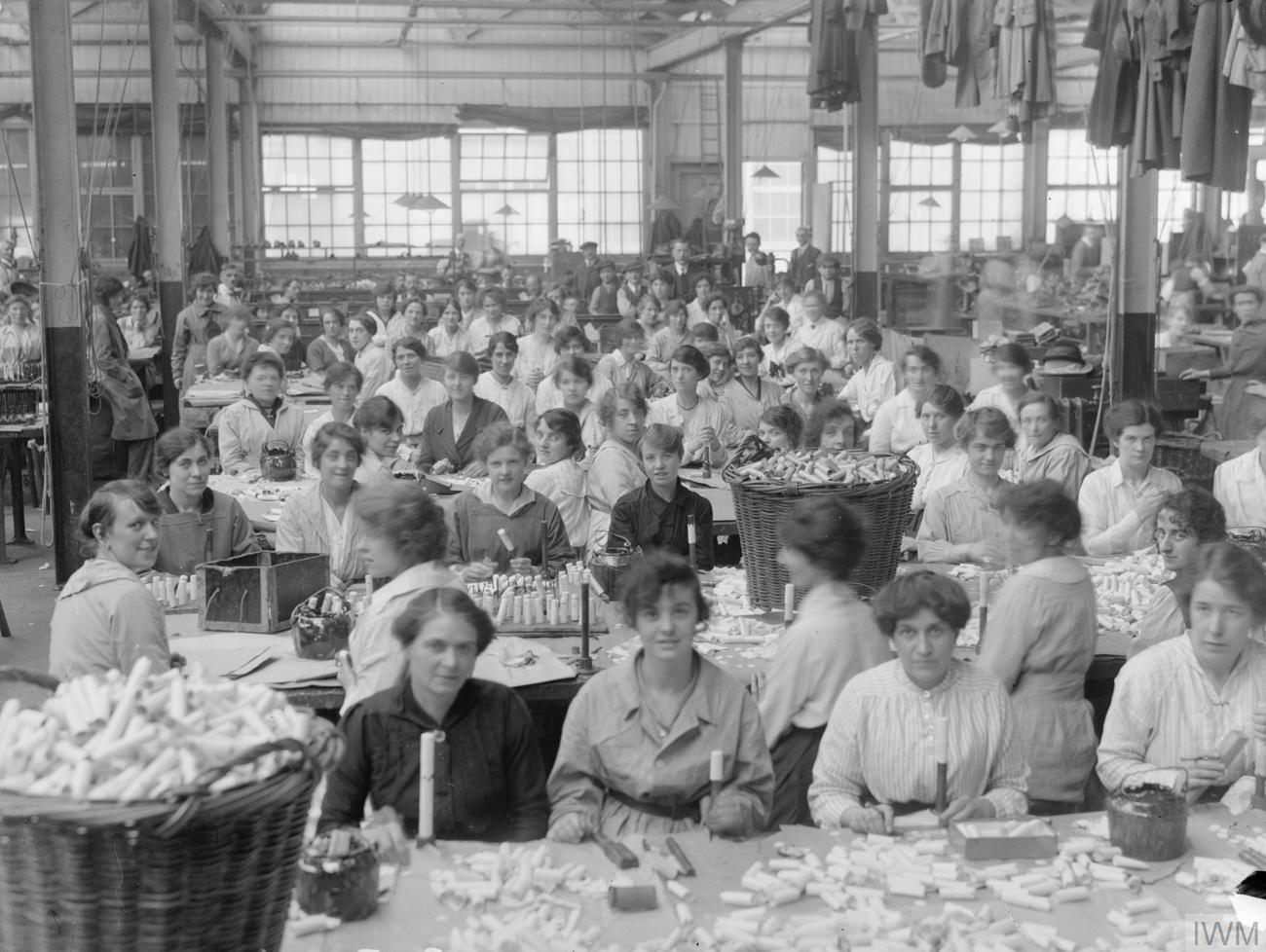
Women working at the Royal Arsenal, Woolwich, during World War I, May 1918

For centuries the area between the Thames and the present-day A206 road has been dominated by docks, warehouses and factories, starting with the Royal Dockyard early in the 16th century, later eclipsed by the Royal Arsenal in scale and grandeur. In the 18th century the Royal Regiment of Artillery and the Corps of Royal Engineers were established in Woolwich, followed by the Royal Military Academy. Other military institutions completed the picture of the garrison town that Woolwich had become in the early 19th century. The town has a distinctive housing history and in the Bathway Quarter it has an equally distinctive civic centre. Although repeatedly rebuilt, its architectural heritage reflects its unusual and important history.

=== Royal Arsenal ===
The older parts of the Royal Arsenal constitute a conservation area. Most buildings of historic interest have been restored and given new uses. The Royal Brass Foundry (1717) is a grade I listed building, while the Dial Arch (1717–20), the Old Royal Military Academy (1720) and the Grand Store (1806–13) are Grade II* listed. Other listed buildings include the Royal Arsenal Gatehouse, Middle Gatehouse, the Main Guard House, two small guardhouses near the Thames, the Shell Foundry Gatehouse, Verbruggen House and two twin pavilions in Laboratory Square, the oldest structures on the site (1696).

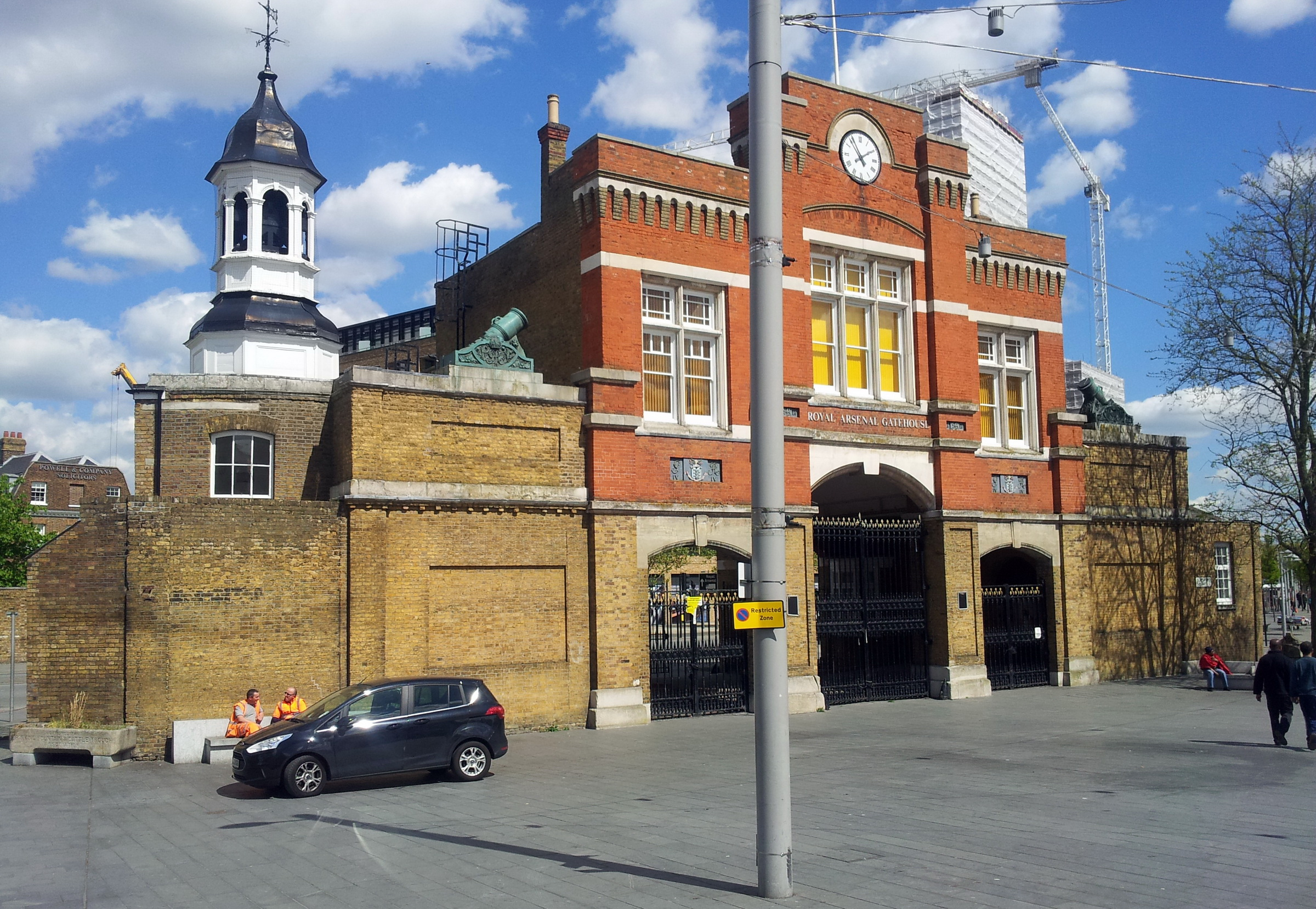
Royal Arsenal Gatehouse

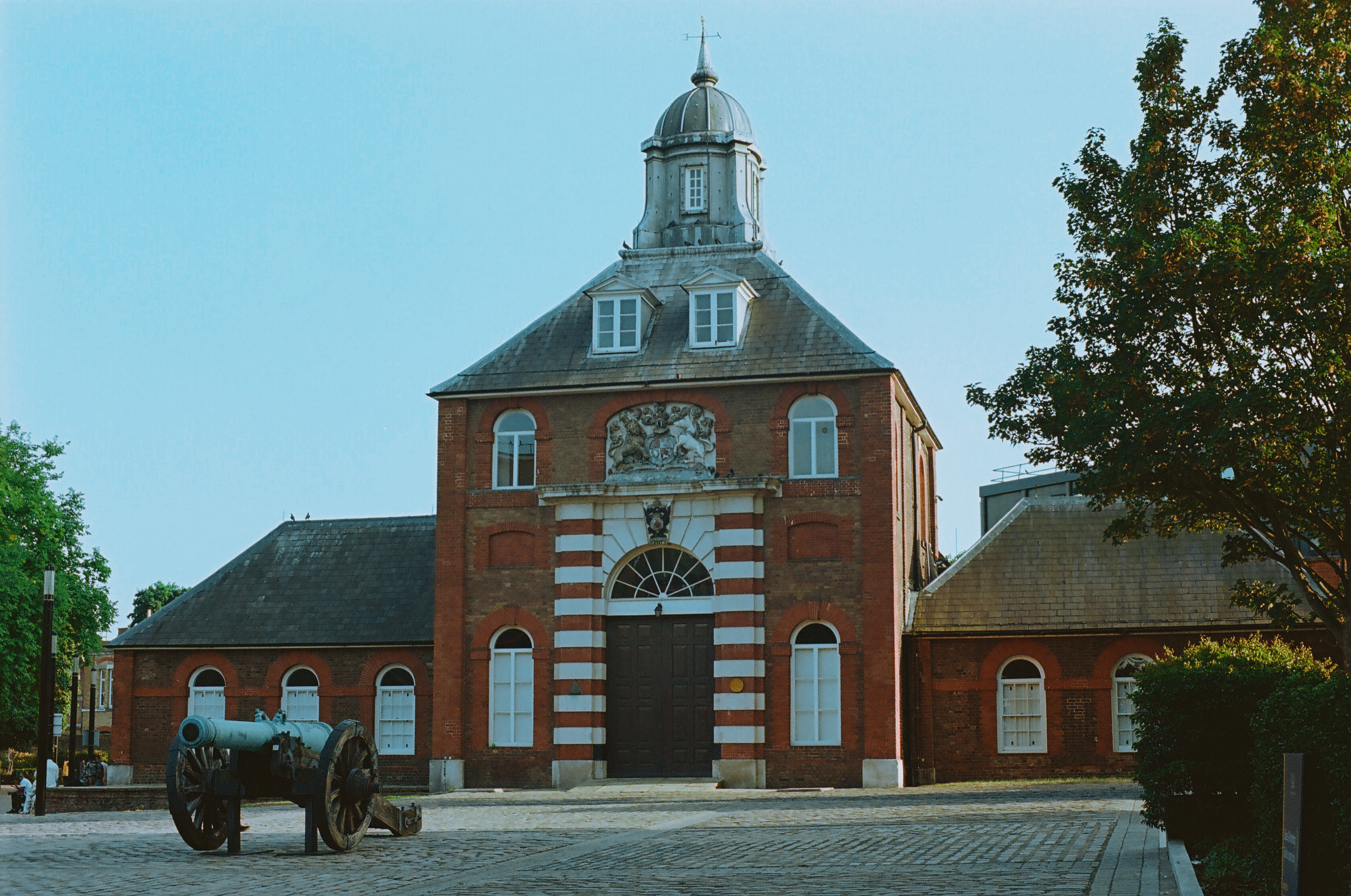
Royal Brass Foundry

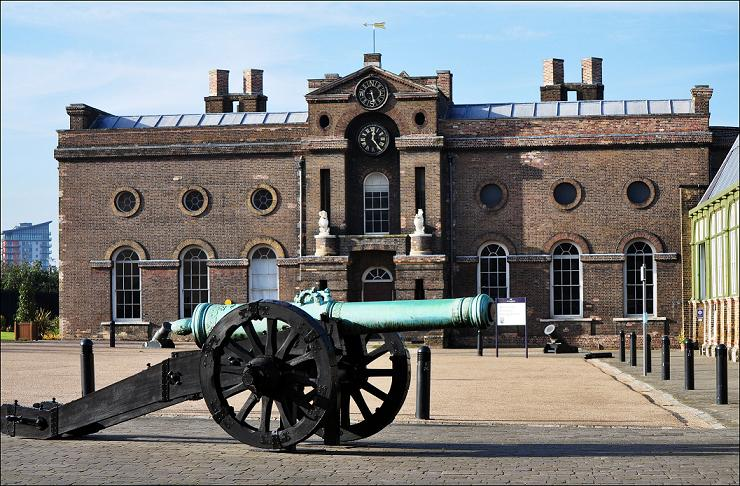
Cannon near the Old Royal Military Academy

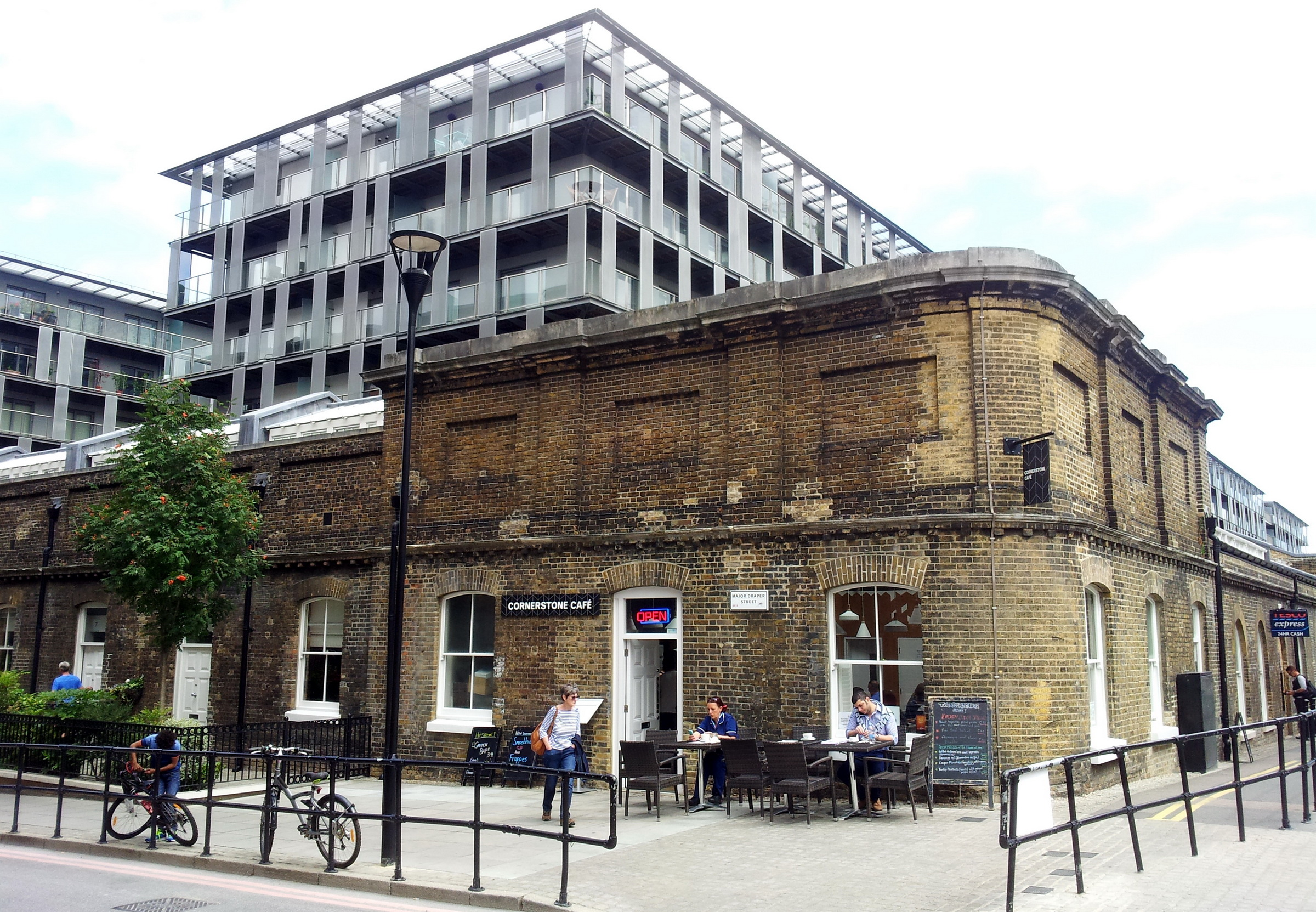
Converted warehouses at the Royal Arsenal

=== Woolwich Dockyard and Riverside ===
At Woolwich Dockyard relatively little of historic interest remains. The main monumental building complex comprises a small cluster of 18th-century buildings: the entrance gate, the guardhouse and the so-called Clock House (Dockyard offices). A pair of 19th-century docks remain on the site of their 16th-century predecessors. The later development of the Dockyard in the Victorian period is represented by the Steam Factory and the Dockyard chimney, a prominent landmark, and further west by a group of buildings at the site of the Siemens Brothers factory.

Between the Arsenal and the Dockyard lies an area that was once Old Woolwich, a part of the town where little of historical interest remains and that, once again, is facing redevelopment. The round entrance building of the Woolwich foot tunnel dates from 1912. Further west, the Thames Barrier is an interesting example of modern architecture and technical achievement. The Thames Path is a National Trail that connects these sites.

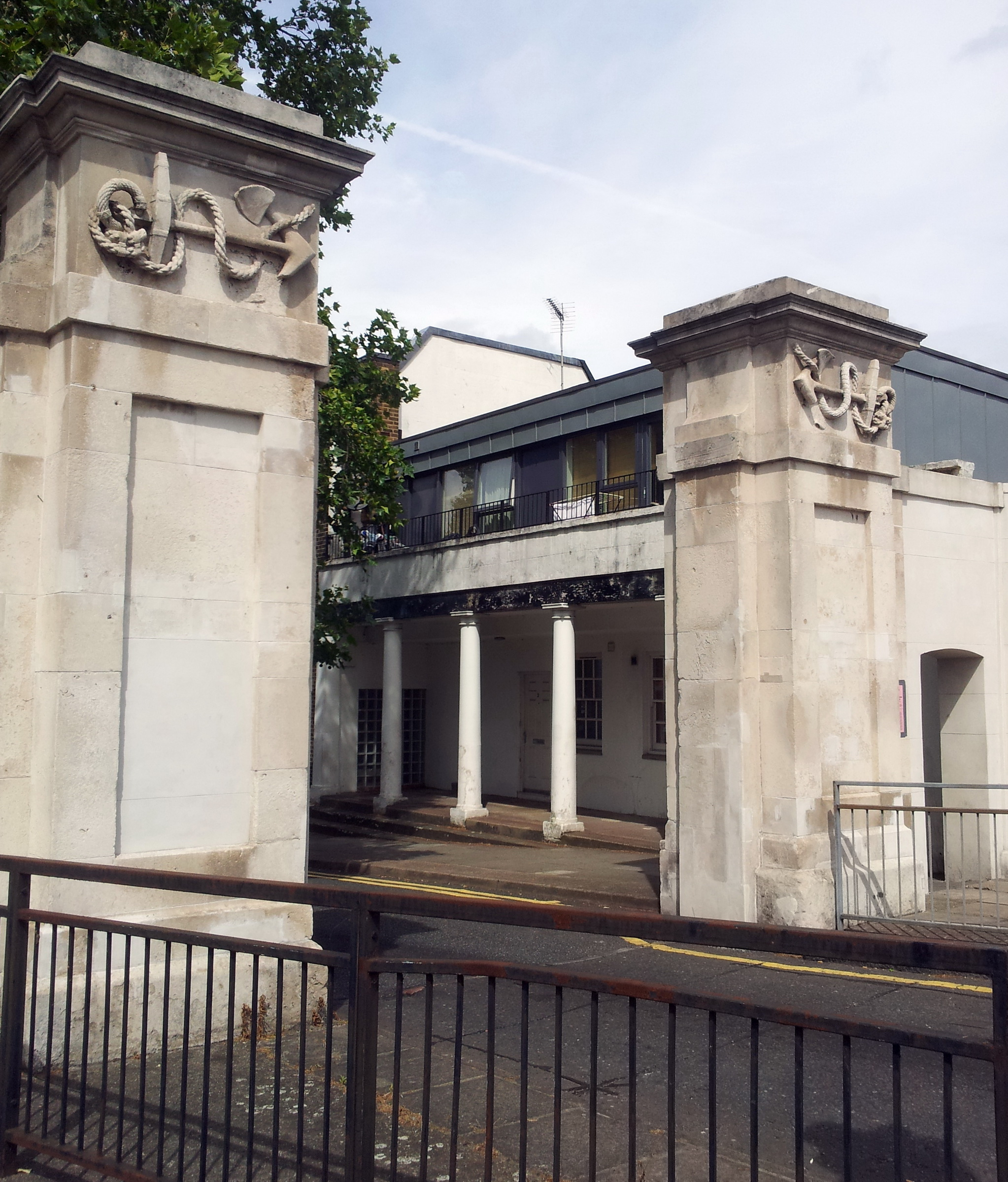
Woolwich Dockyard entrance gate

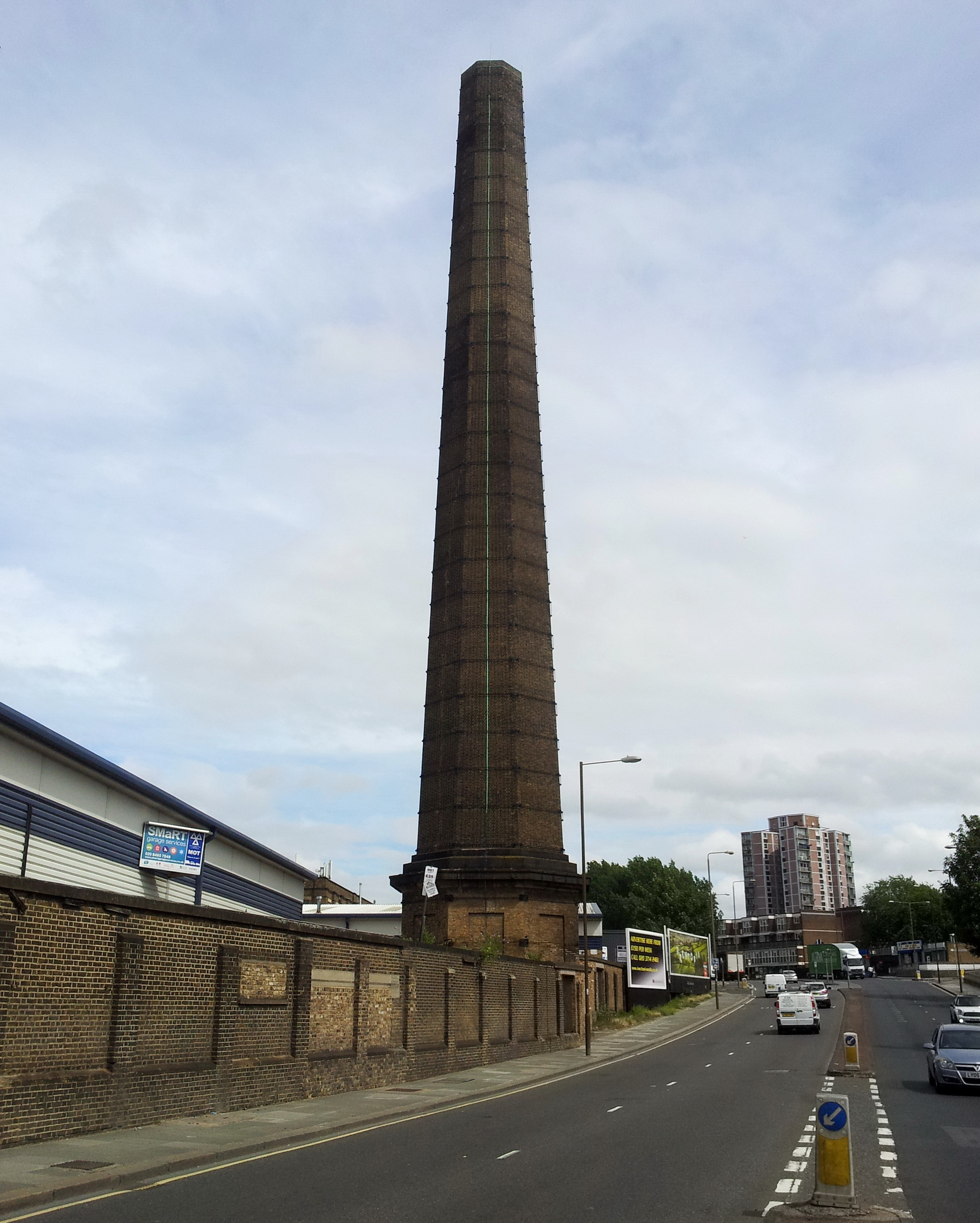
The Dockyard chimney

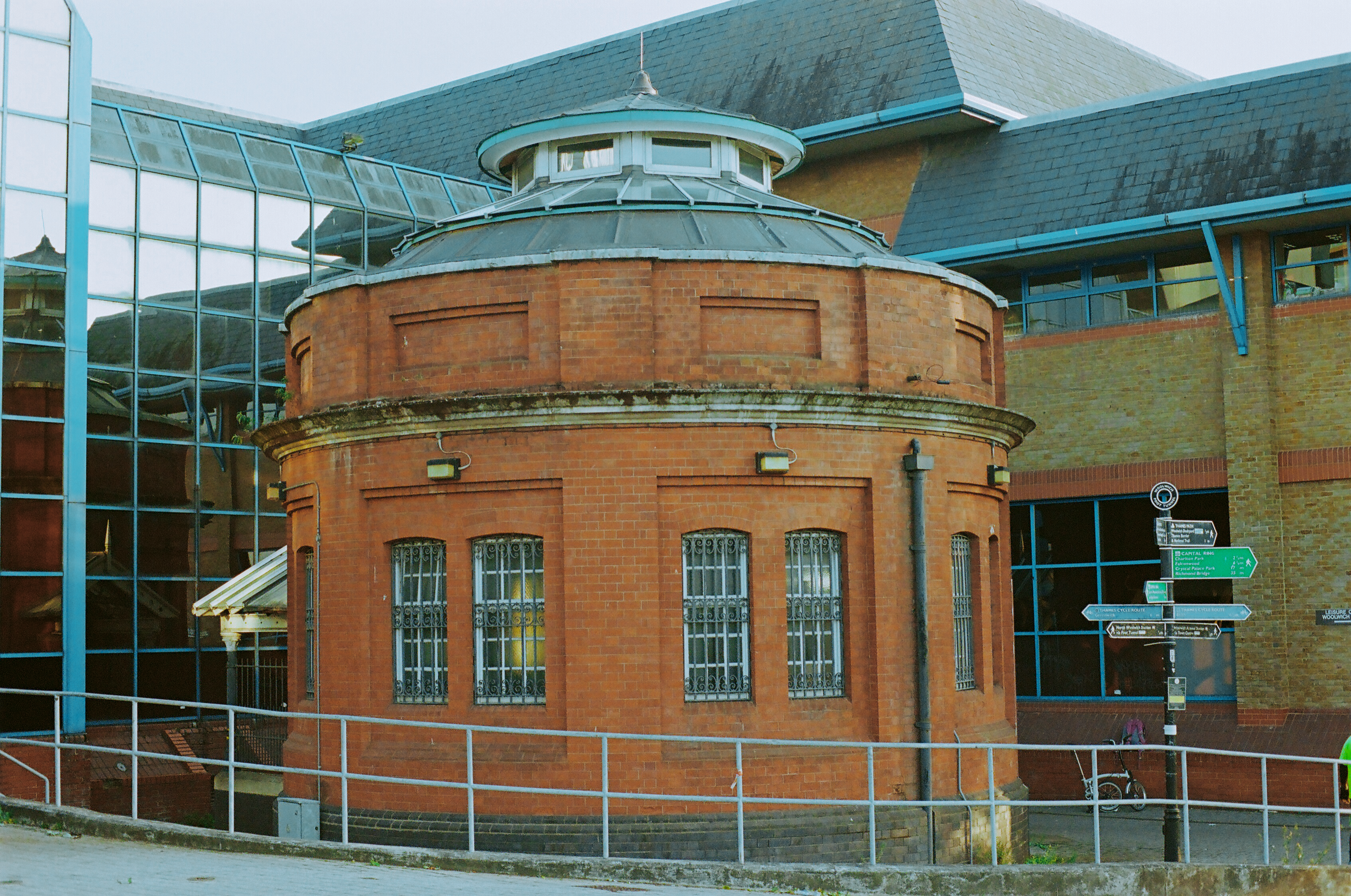
Entrance building Woolwich foot tunnel

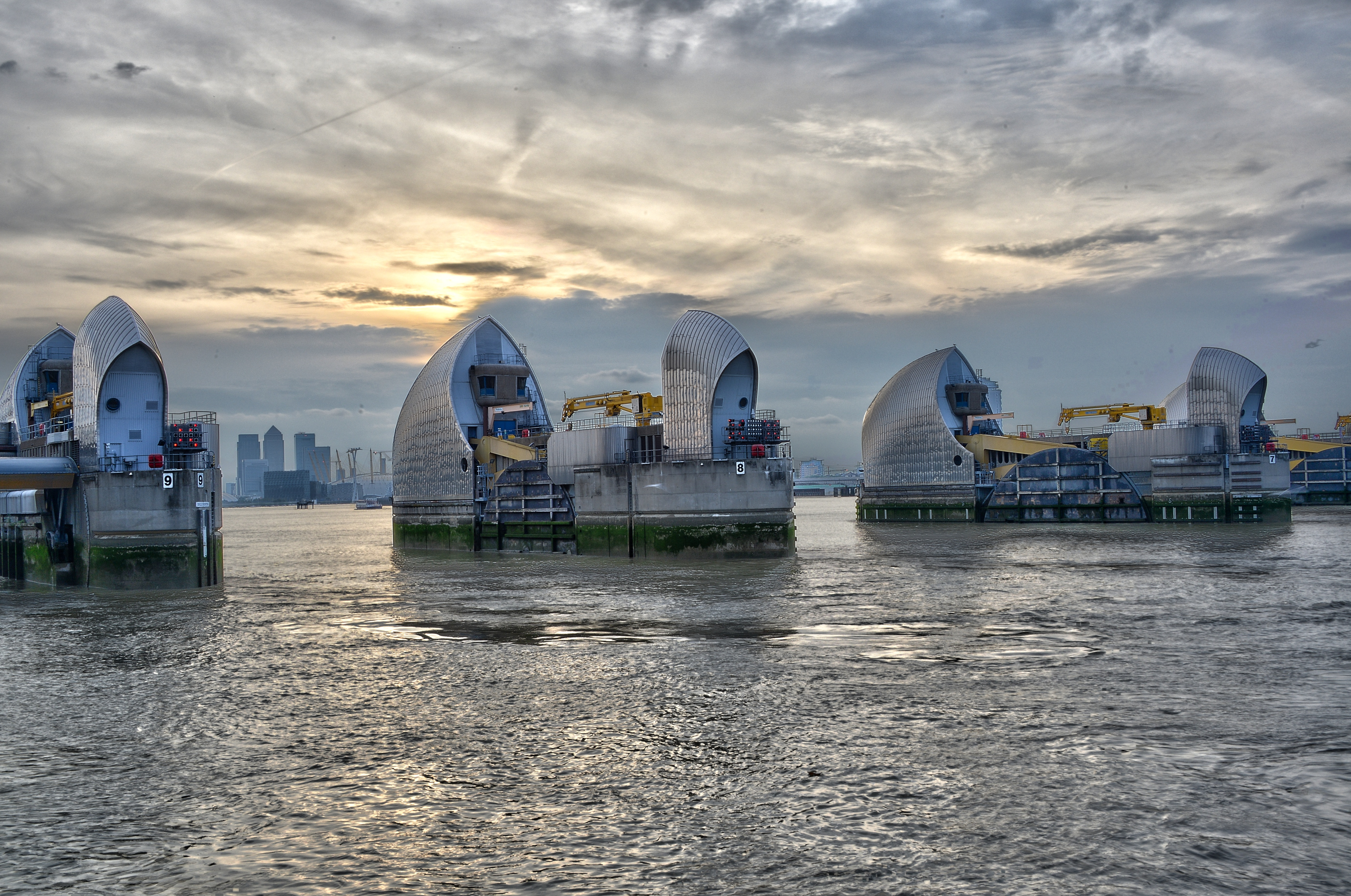
Thames Barrier

=== Other military buildings ===
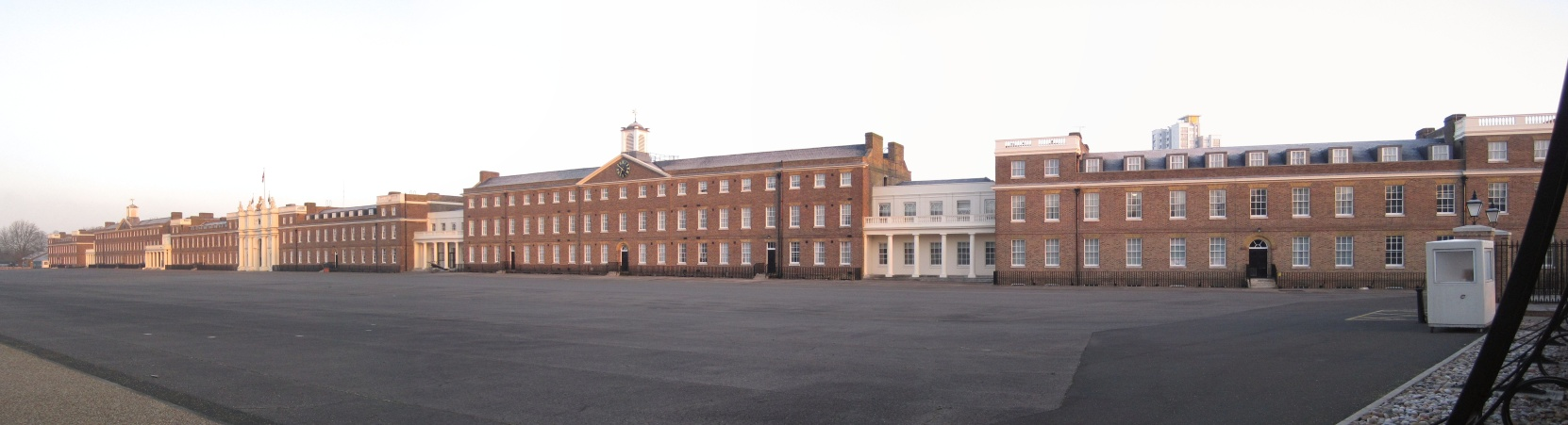
Royal Artillery Barracks

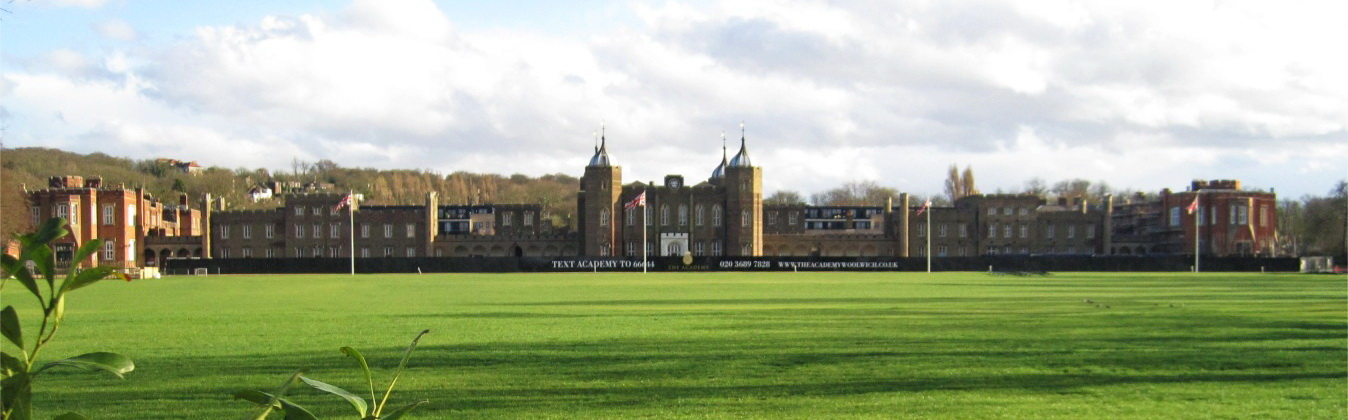
Royal Military Academy

Elsewhere, monumental buildings testify to Woolwich's rich military history. Woolwich Common with its surrounding buildings has been designated a conservation area. The Neoclassical façade of the Royal Artillery Barracks (James Wyatt, 1776–1802) is the longest façade in London, stretching along the north end of the common. Across the road, Government House (1781) was the quarters of the Garrison Commandant from 1855 to 1995. Of the nearby Garrison Church of St George only the shell remains after it was bombed during the Second World War. Its Neo-Romanesque architecture and remnants of mosaics are still impressive. John Nash's Rotunda, a round brick building with a leaded tent roof, until 2001 housed the Royal Artillery Museum and now serves as a boxing ring for the King's Troop, Royal Horse Artillery in nearby Napier Lines Barracks.

The Royal Military Academy at the south end of Woolwich Common was also designed by James Wyatt and has an almost equally long façade in Mock Tudor style. Other military buildings that survive include Connaught Barracks (built as the Royal Artillery Hospital in 1780), Green Hill Military School and Royal Herbert Hospital on Shooter's Hill. The Royal Engineers' HQ was moved to Chatham in 1856, but a small detachment remained in Woolwich, quartered in what is now Engineer House on Mill Hill, just off the Common. Several listed buildings were demolished in the 1970s, including James Wyatt's Engineers Barracks (built for the Royal Military Artificers in 1803), Lewis Wyatt's Grand Depot Barracks (begun in 1805-6 for the Field Train department), Cambridge Barracks (1842, of which the gatehouse still stands) and Red Barracks (1858, only the boundary wall and entrance gate remain). The latter two, on Frances Street, were originally built as the Royal Marine Barracks, Woolwich for the Woolwich Division of the Royal Marines, and each was considered an innovative and influential design. The Marines departed with the closure of the Dockyard, whereupon the buildings were converted into barracks accommodation for various military corps. Rushgrove House (1806) housed the Colonel Commandant of the Marine Barracks (later Cambridge Barracks) from 1855.

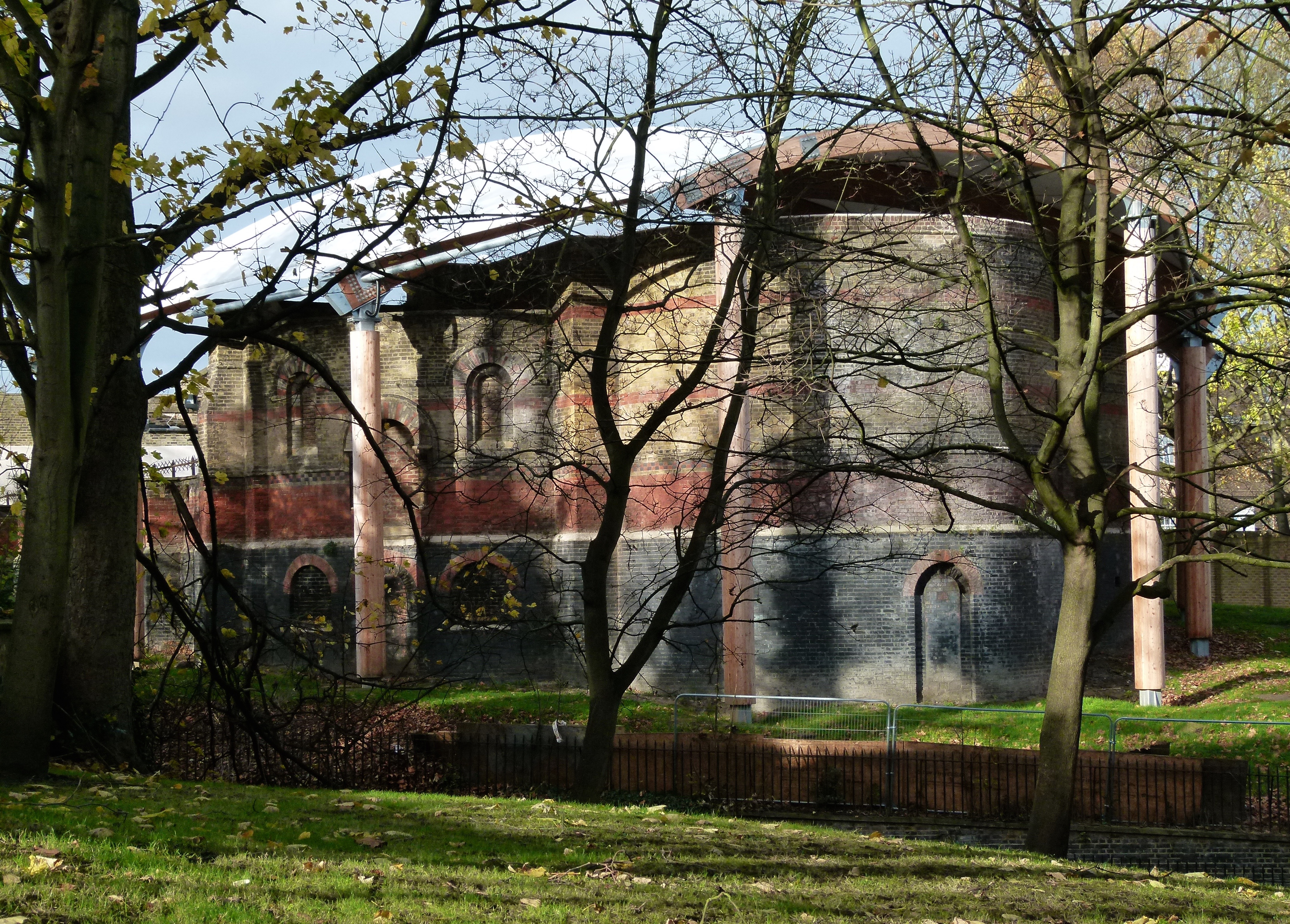
Ruined Garrison Church (1863)

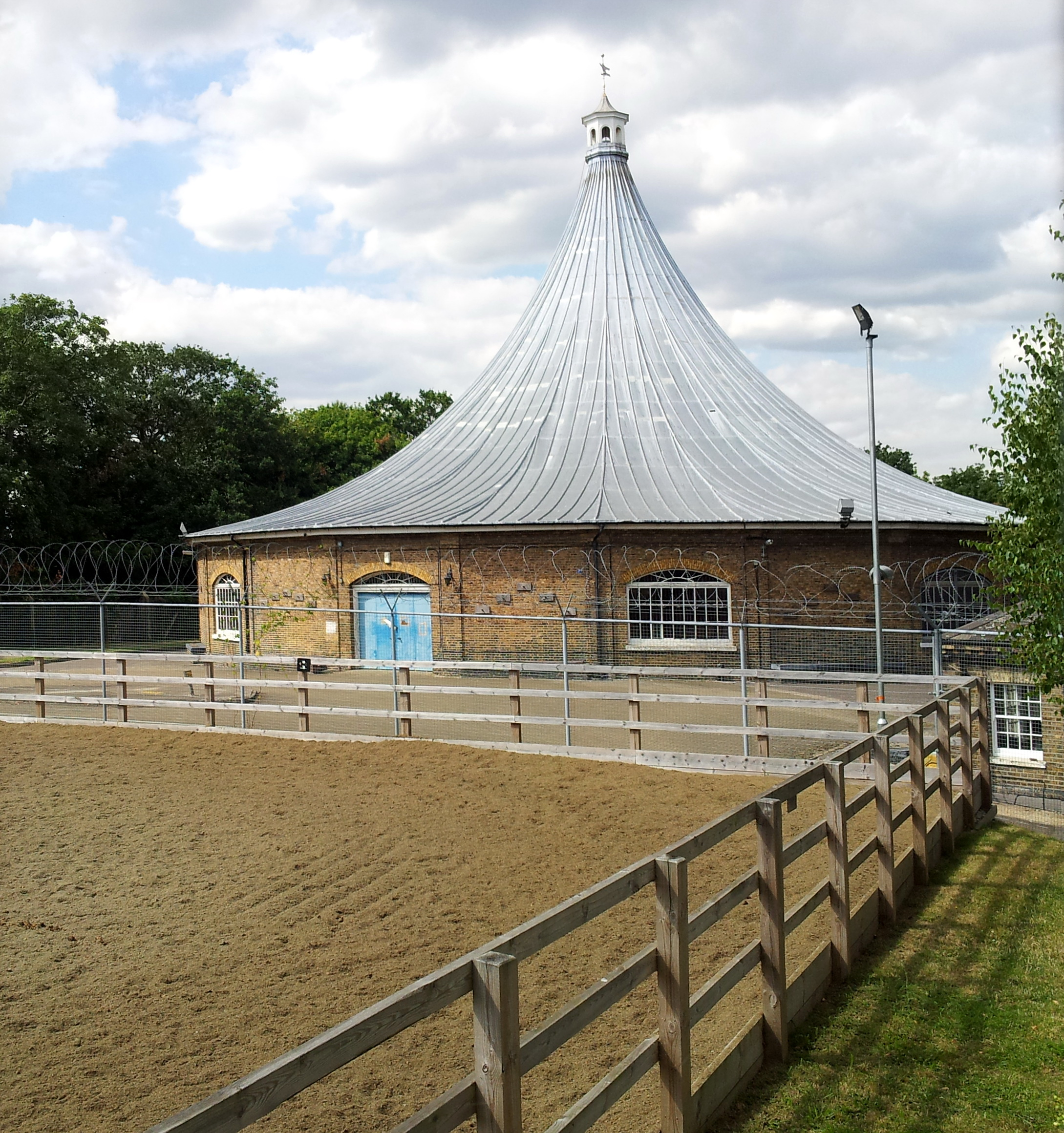
John Nash's Rotunda (1814/20)

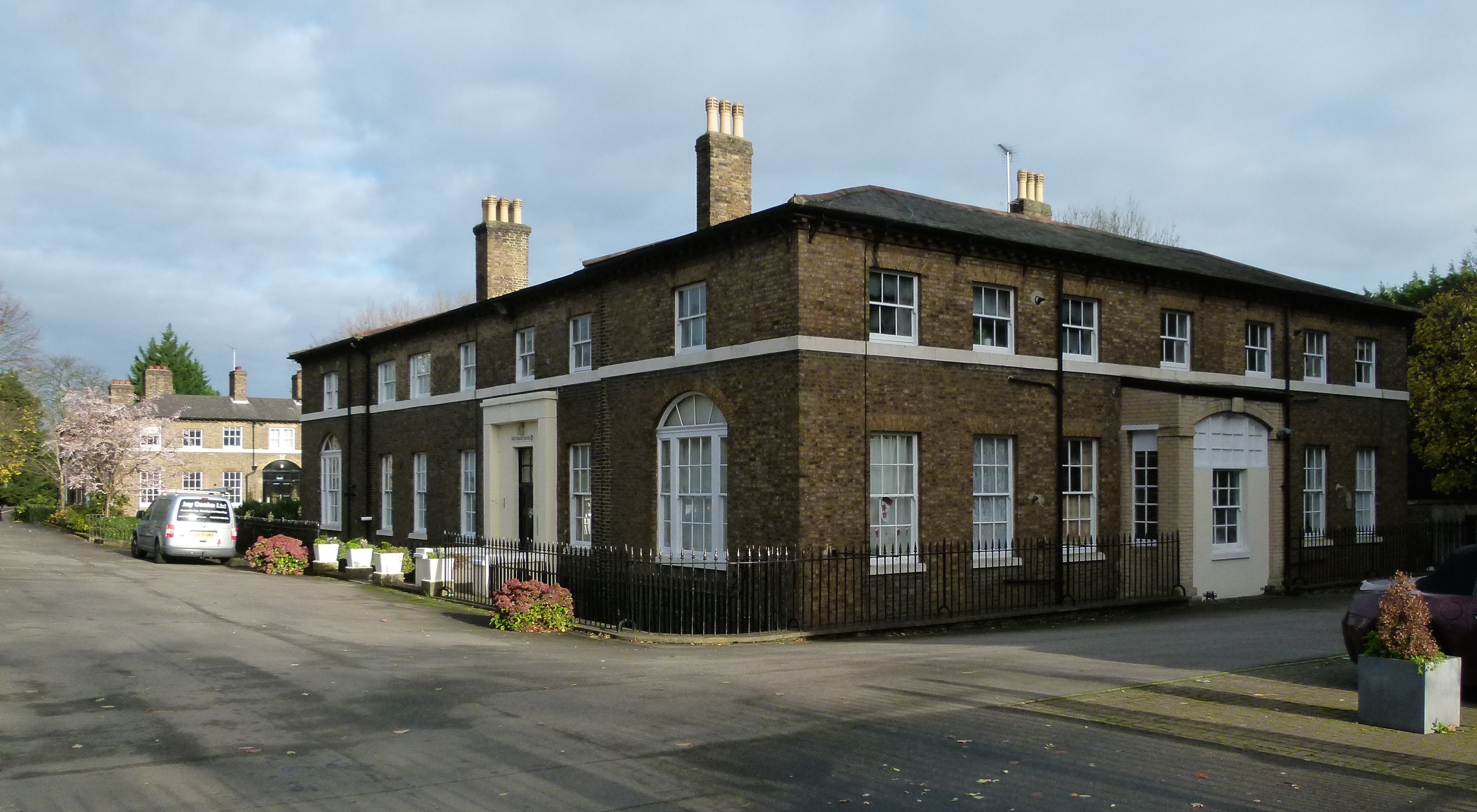
Former Connaught Barracks (1780)

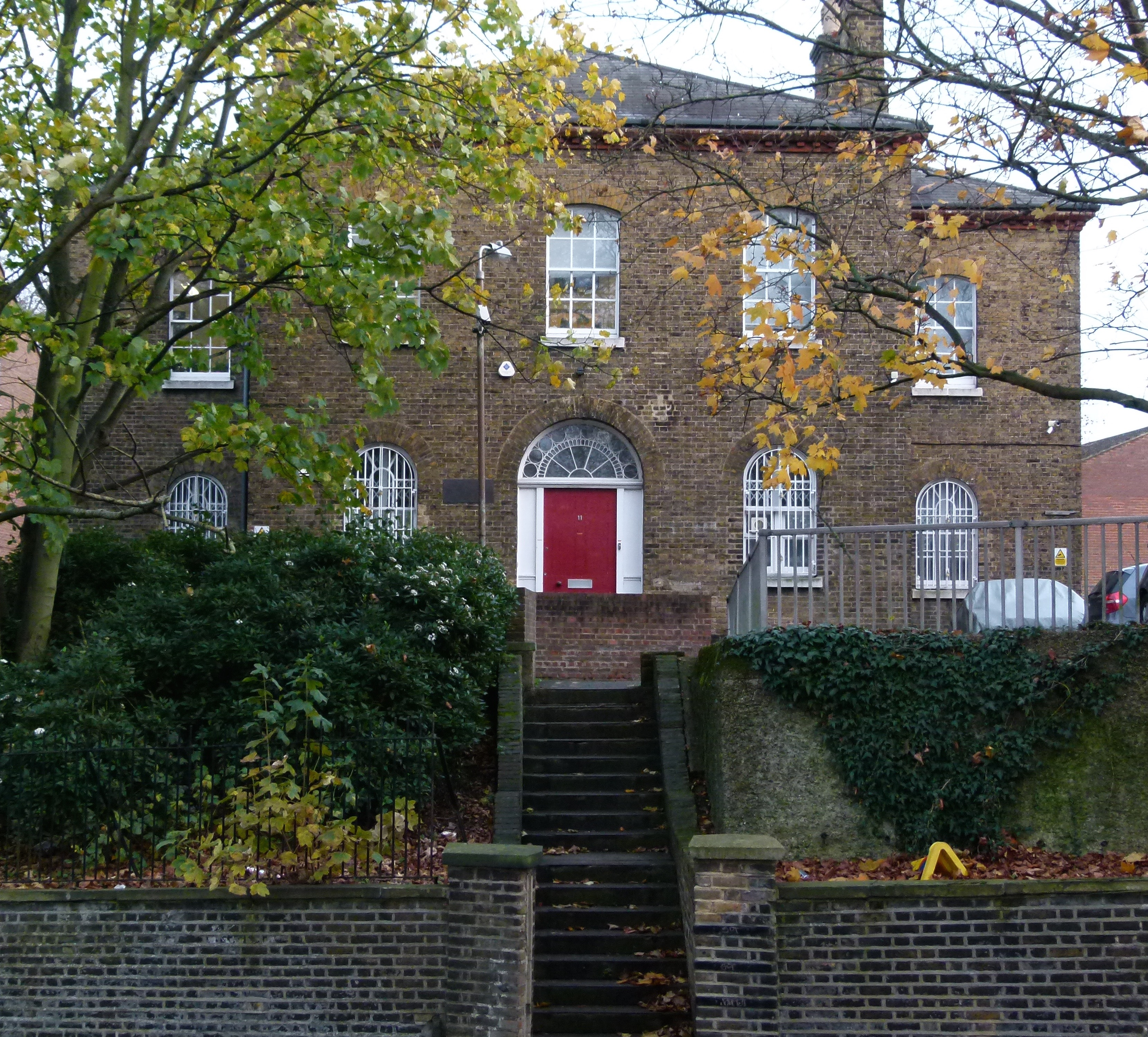
Engineer House (1858)

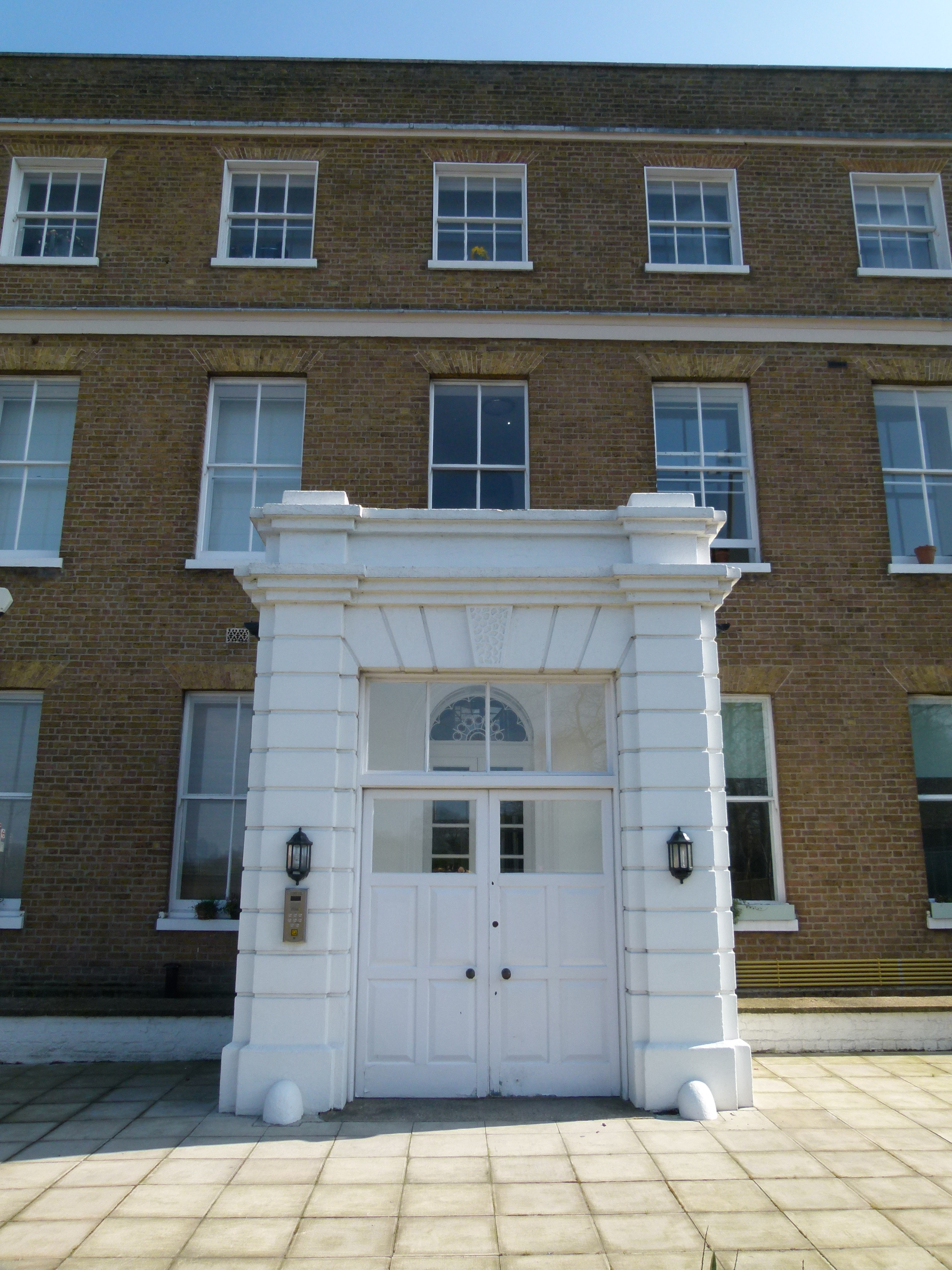
Government House (1781)

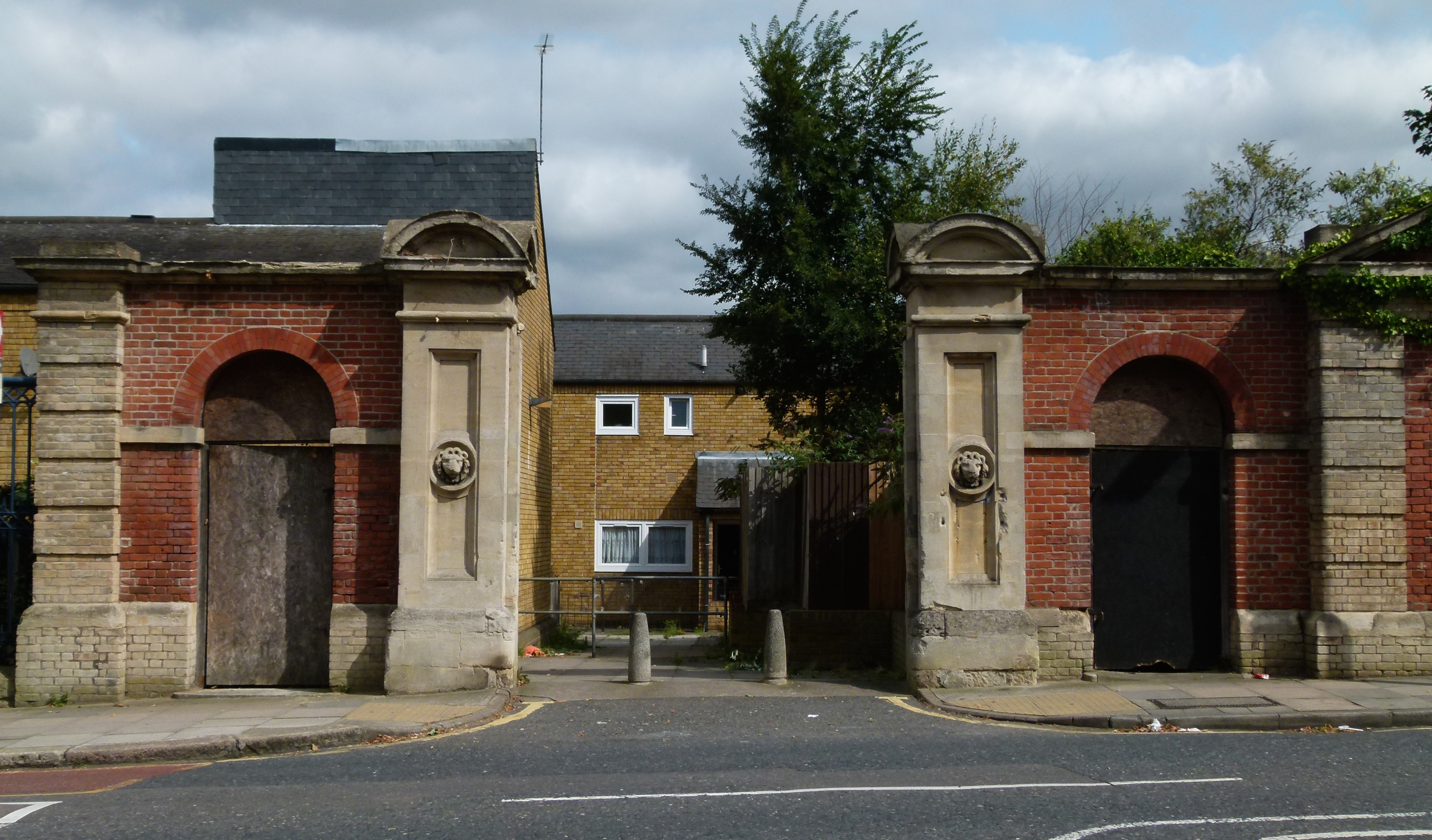
Former Red Barracks gate (1860)

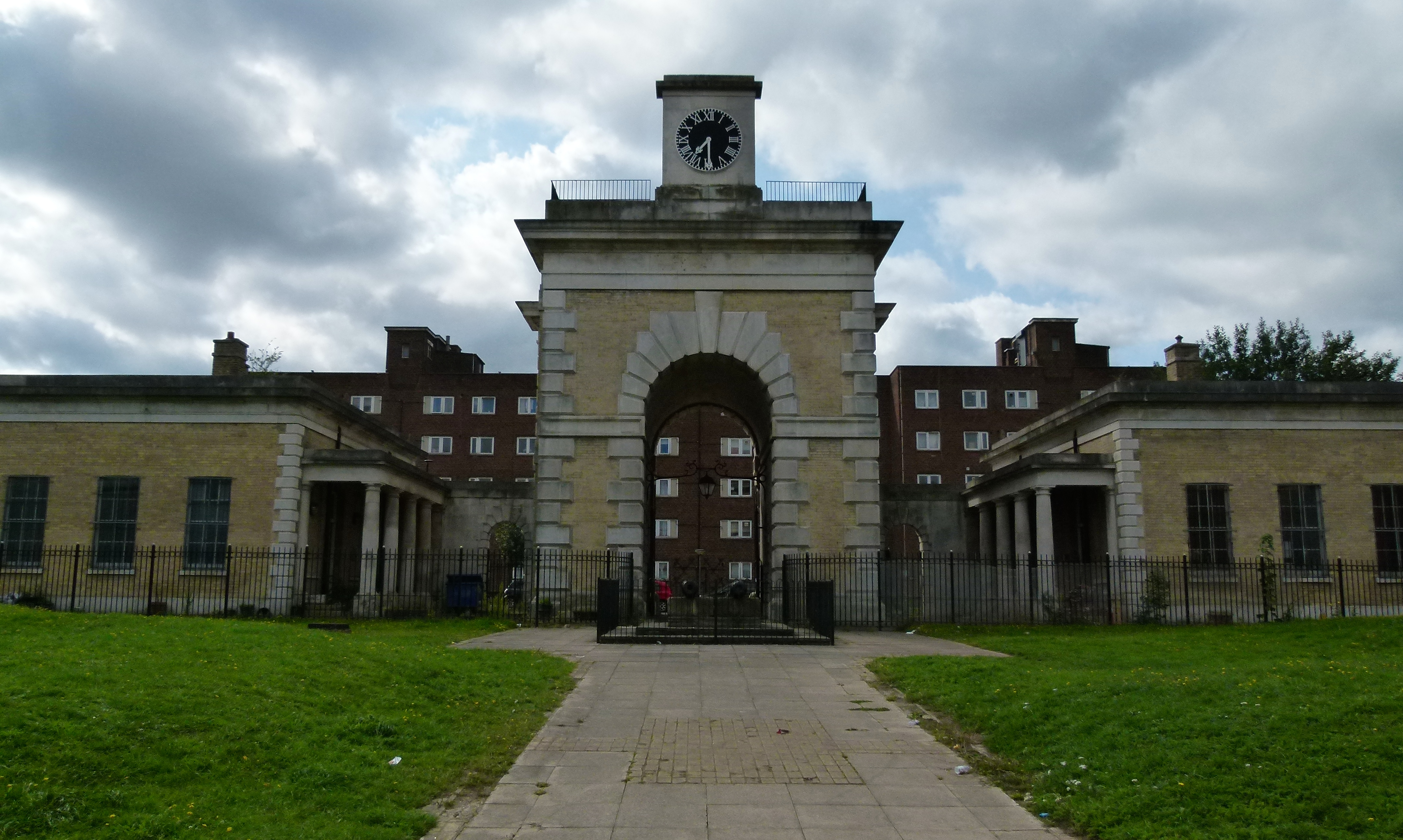
Gatehouse Cambridge Barracks (1848)

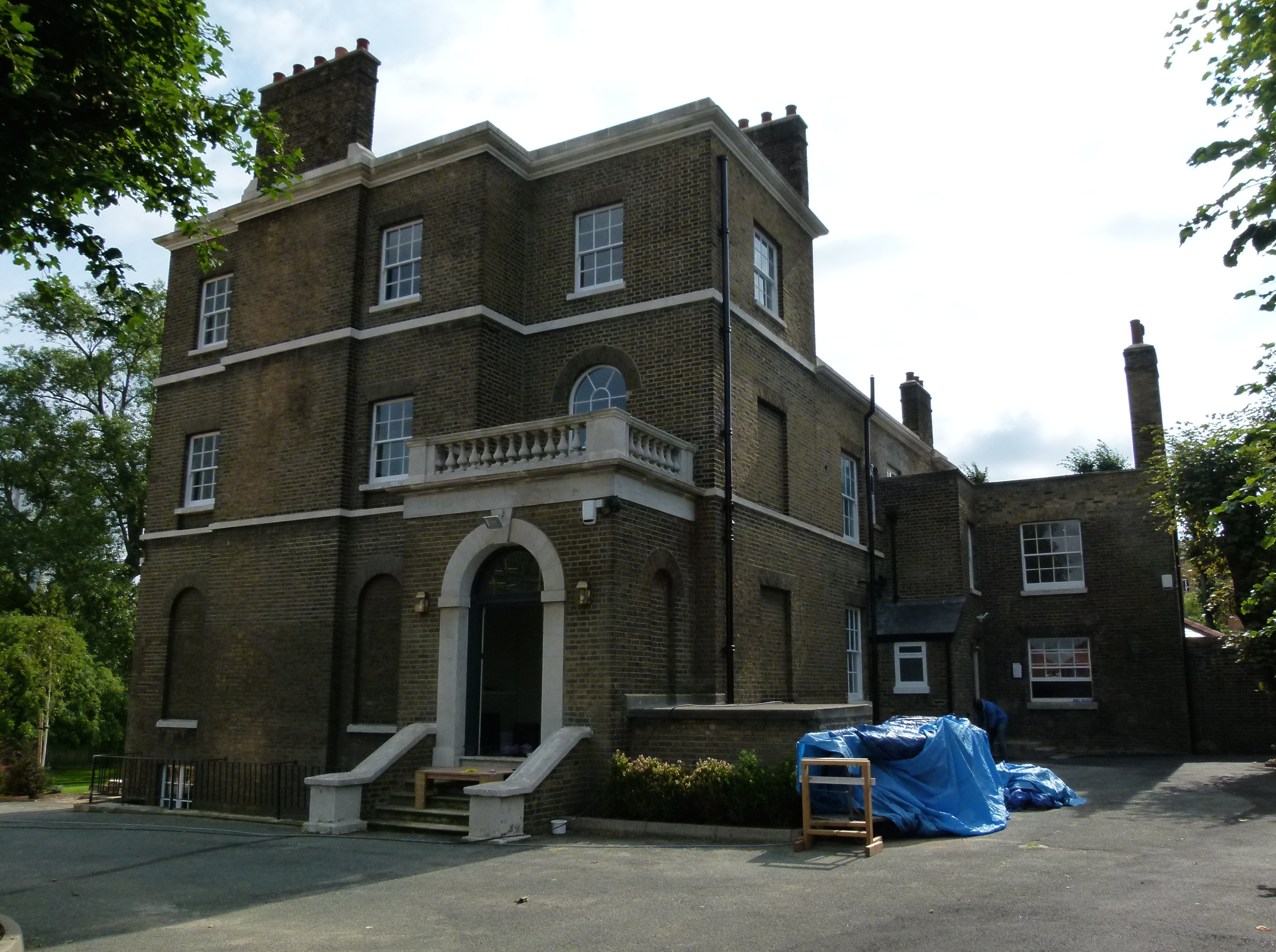
Rushgrove House (1806)

=== Woolwich Centre ===
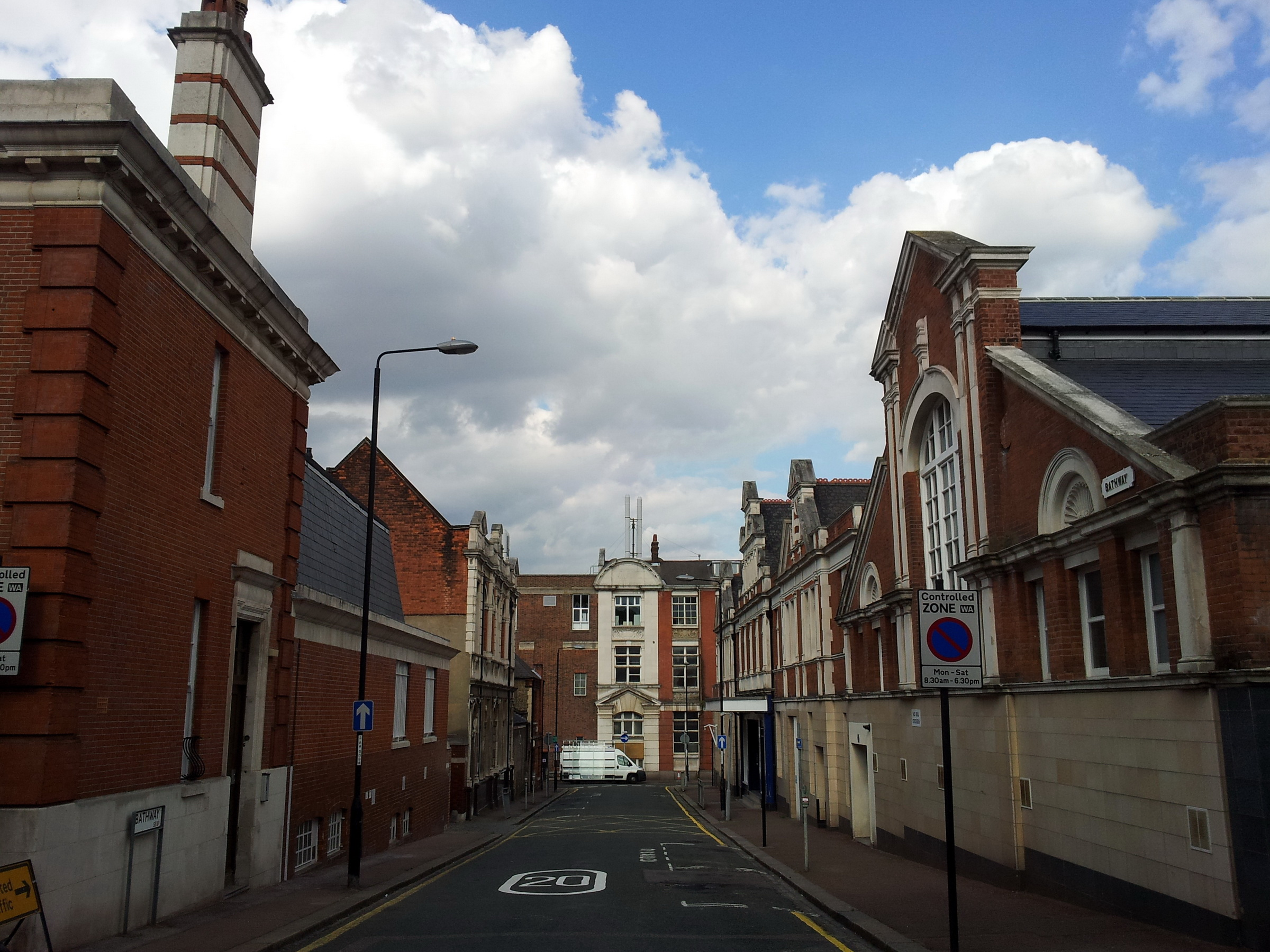
Bathway Quarter

Virtually nothing is left of the old town of Woolwich which was near the ferry and the parish church along the Thames. In the early 19th century the commercial and administrative centre moved south to its present location around Powis Street, Beresford Square and the Bathway Quarter. Although 20th-century economic decline and infrastructural works have had their effects, there are still some interesting buildings in Woolwich town centre. The best preserved area is perhaps the Bathway Quarter with the former Public Baths, the Old and New Town Hall, the former Magistrates Court and Police Station, the Old Public Library and several historic buildings of Woolwich Polytechnic.

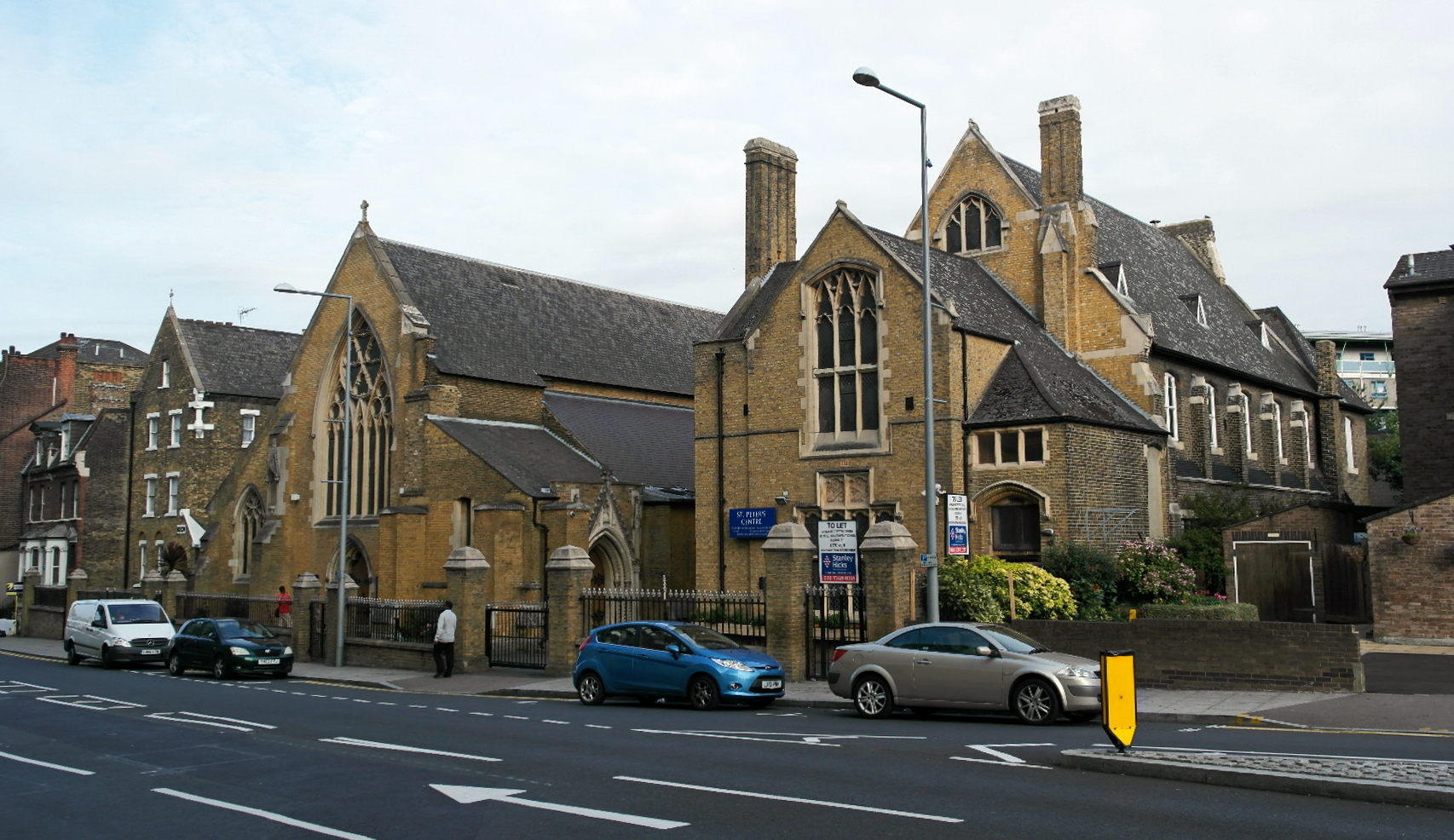
St Peter's rectory, church and school

In nearby Powis Street and Hare Street some late Victorian shop façades have been preserved, notably by local architect Henry Hudson Church. The western end of Powis Street is dominated by two former Royal Arsenal Co-operative Society (RACS) department stores, one late Victorian, the other one in Art Deco style. Nearer to the river are two large cinemas, both built in 1937 and both in use as Pentecostal church halls. The former Odeon Cinema (now occupied by the New Wine Church) is a fine example of an Art Deco theatre; the former Granada Cinema has lavish interior decorations.

Of the grand houses that once stretched along Woolwich Common and dotted the northern slopes of Shooter's Hill, little remains. Rushgrove House, Shrewsbury House and Woodhill Court survive but have lost their spacious gardens. Woolwich parish church, St Mary Magdalen is a plain brick 1730s building with a spireless tower. Other religious buildings of interest include the Roman Catholic St Peter's Church (by Pugin), and two Sikh gurdwaras, one a former Methodist church, the other a former Masonic hall.

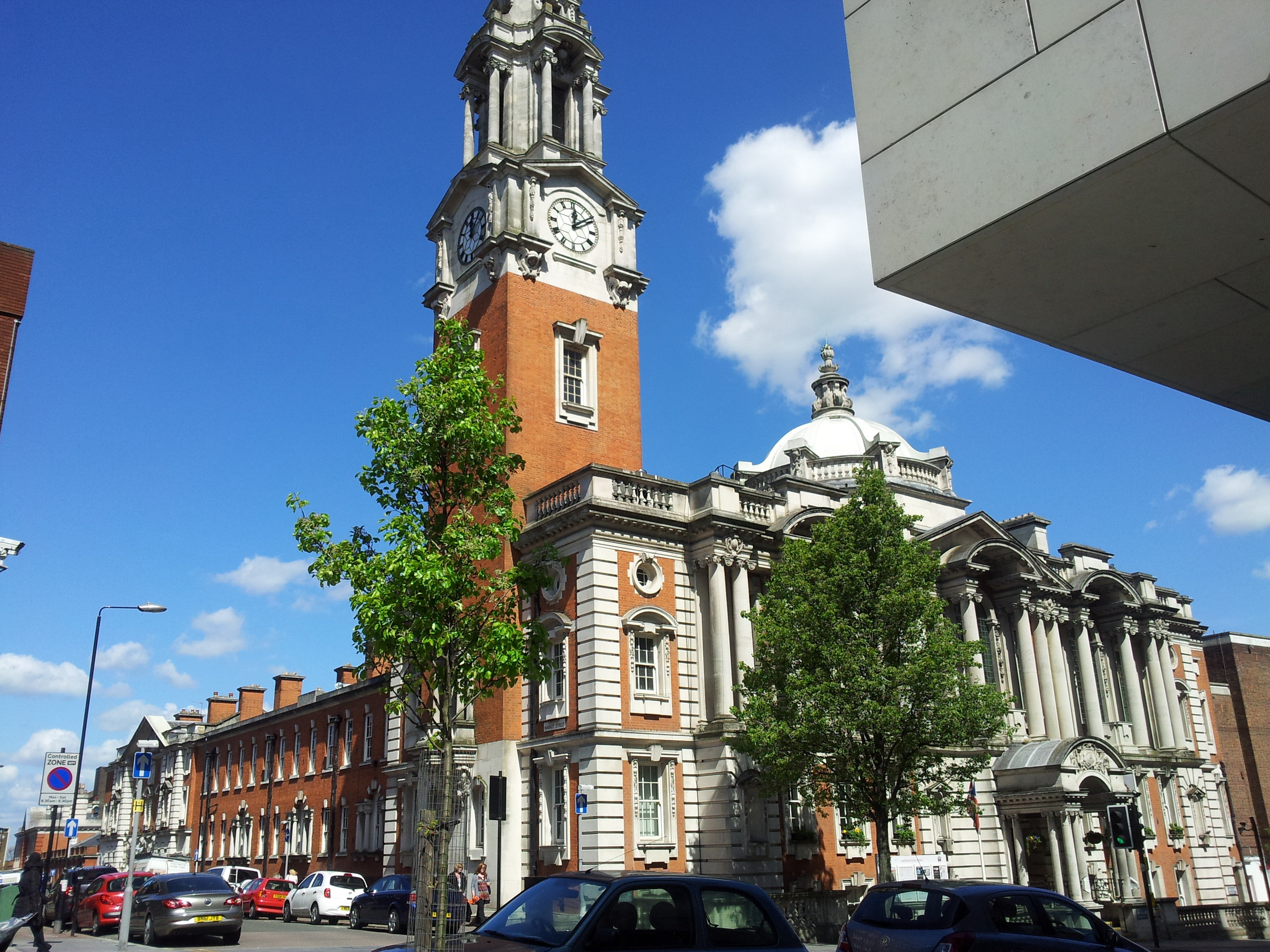
Woolwich Town Hall

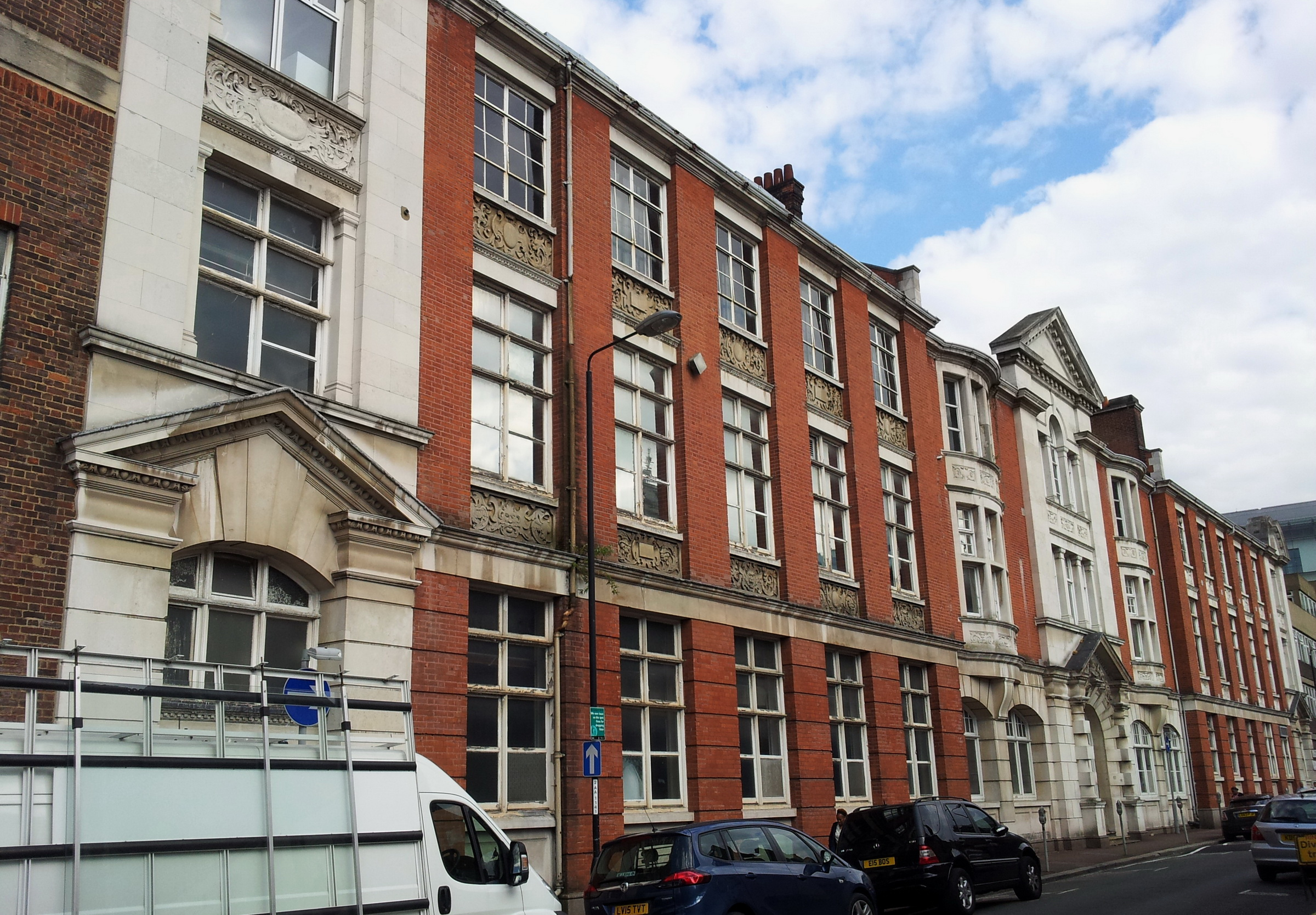
Former Woolwich Polytechnic College

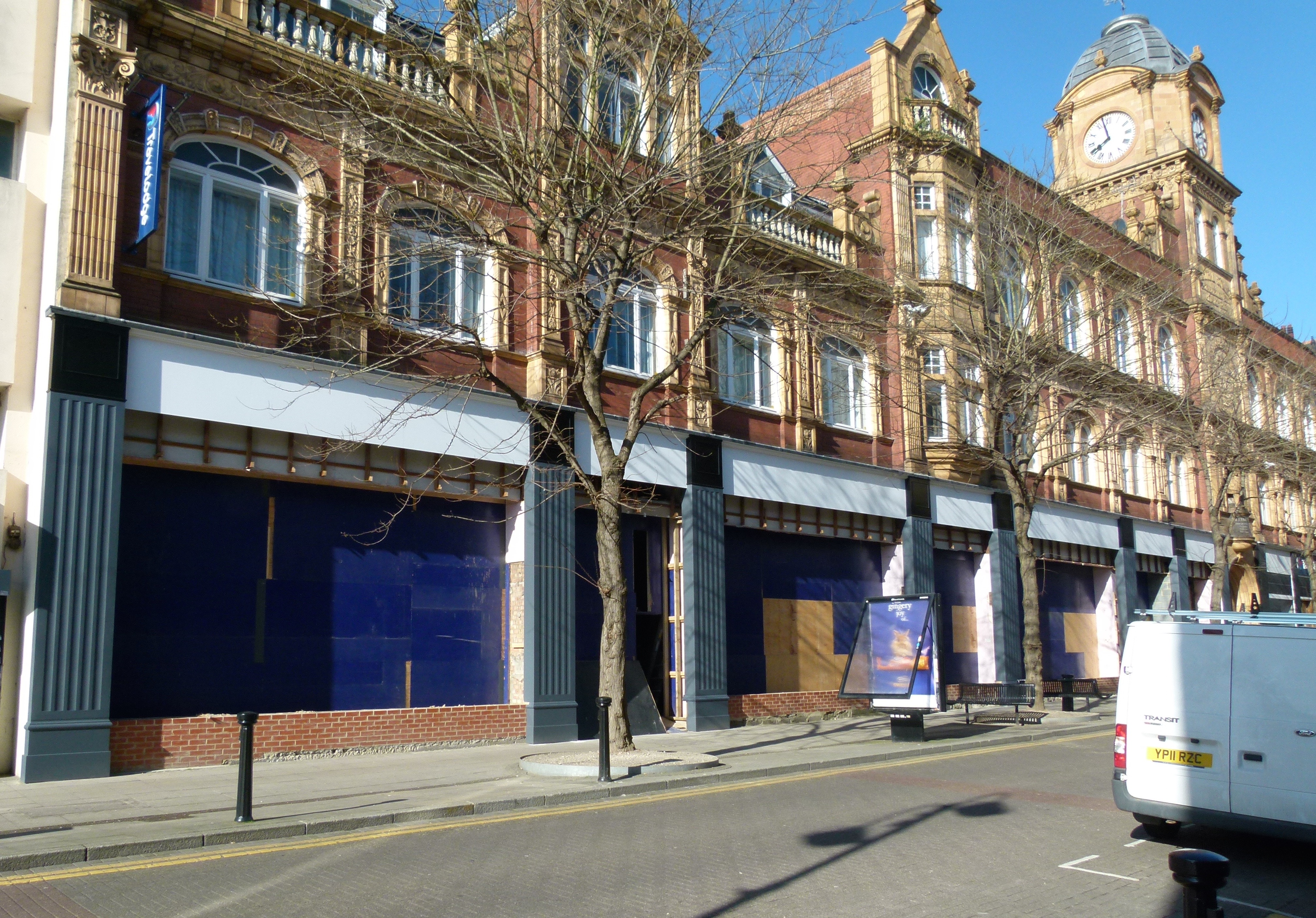
Victorian RACS building

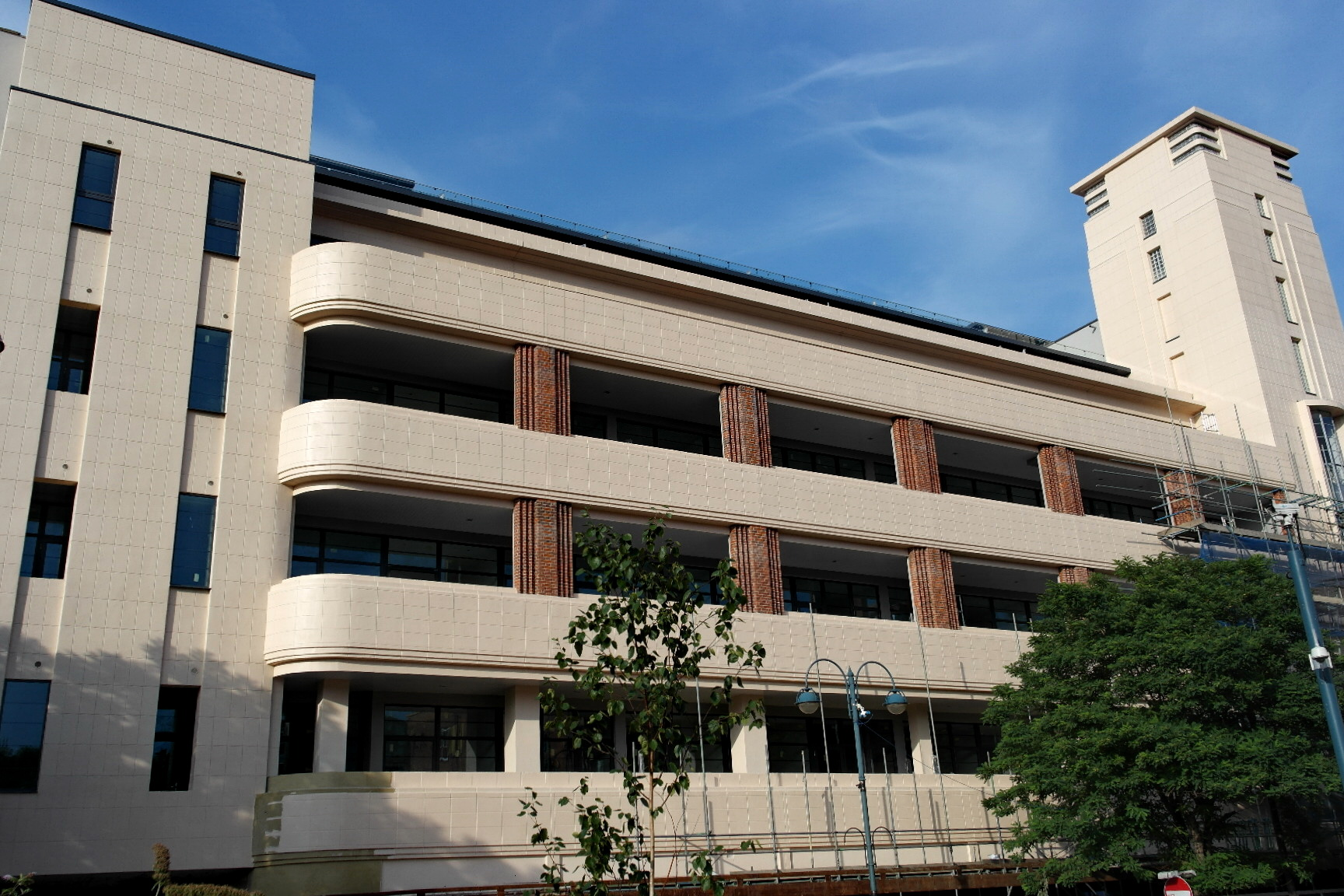
Art deco former RACS department store

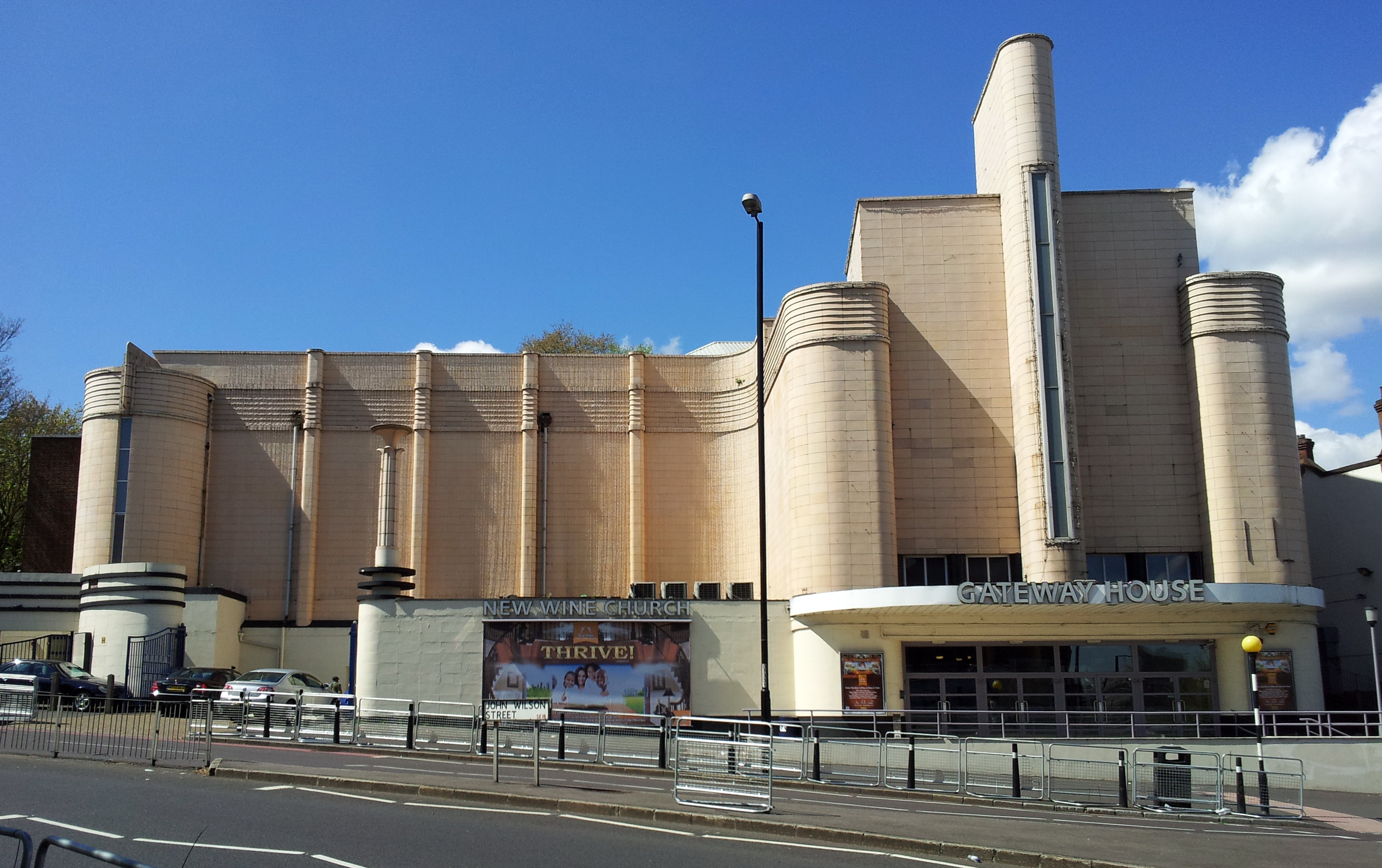
Former Odeon Cinema

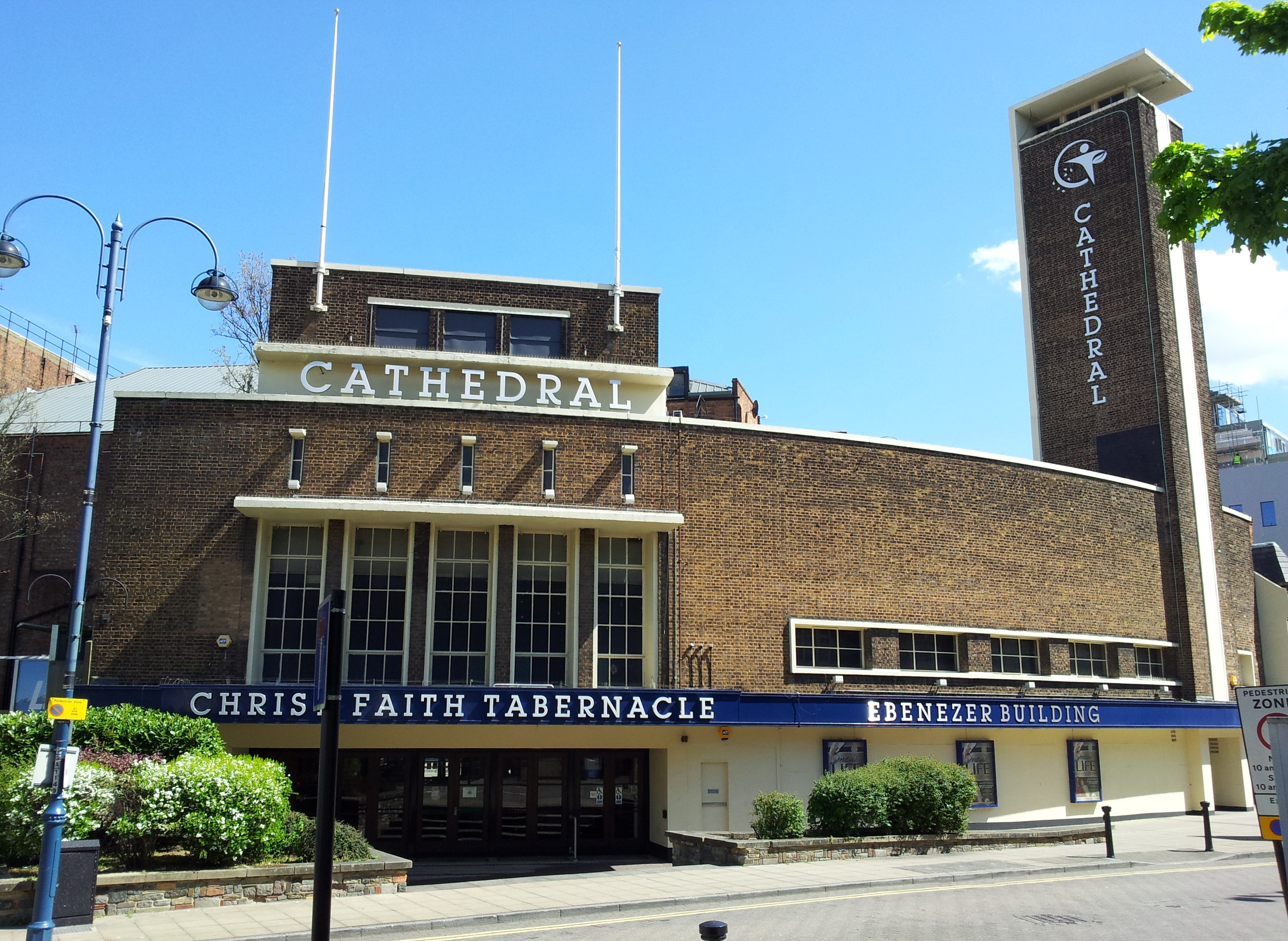
Former Granada Cinema

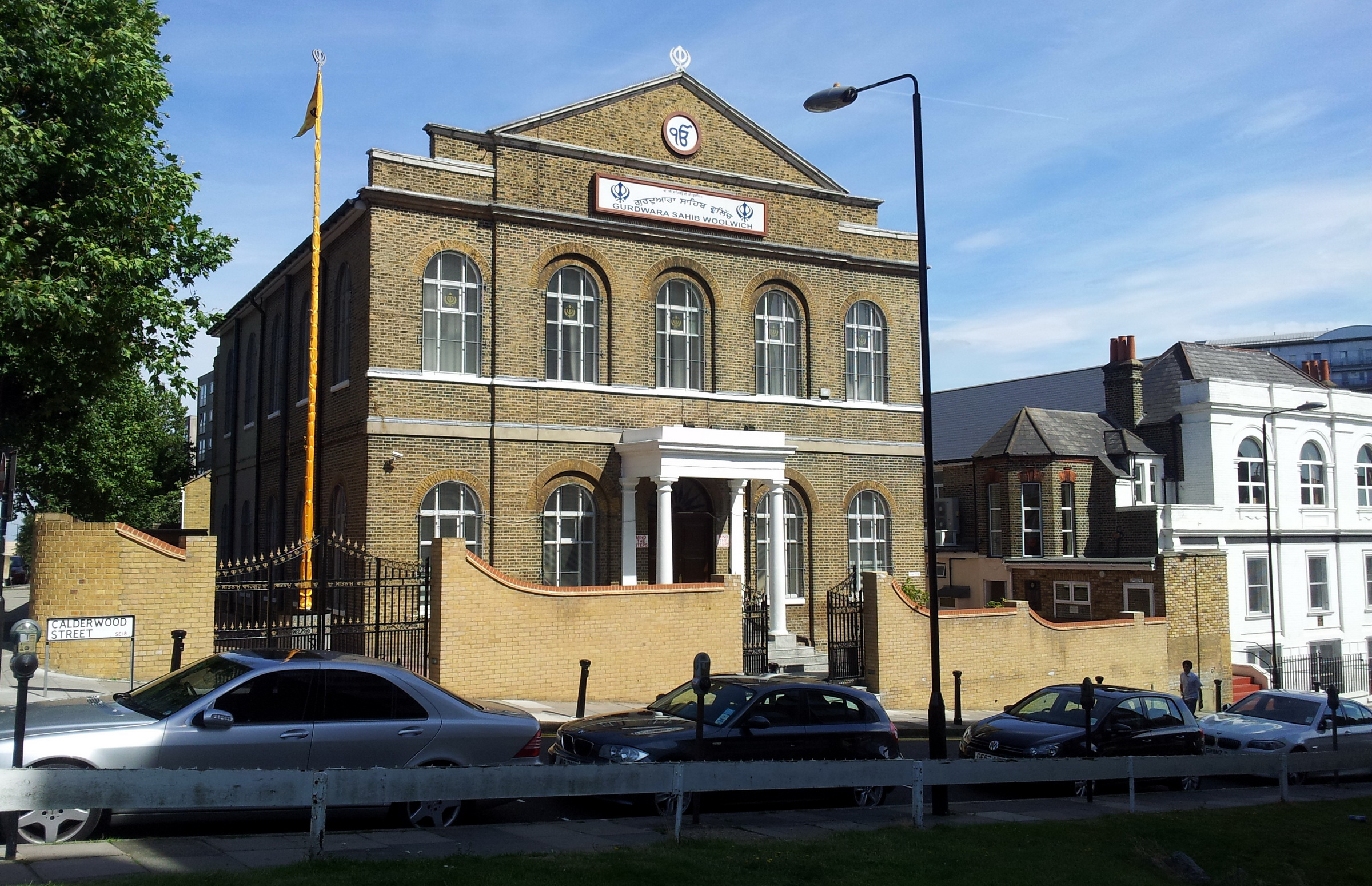
Gurdwara Sahib

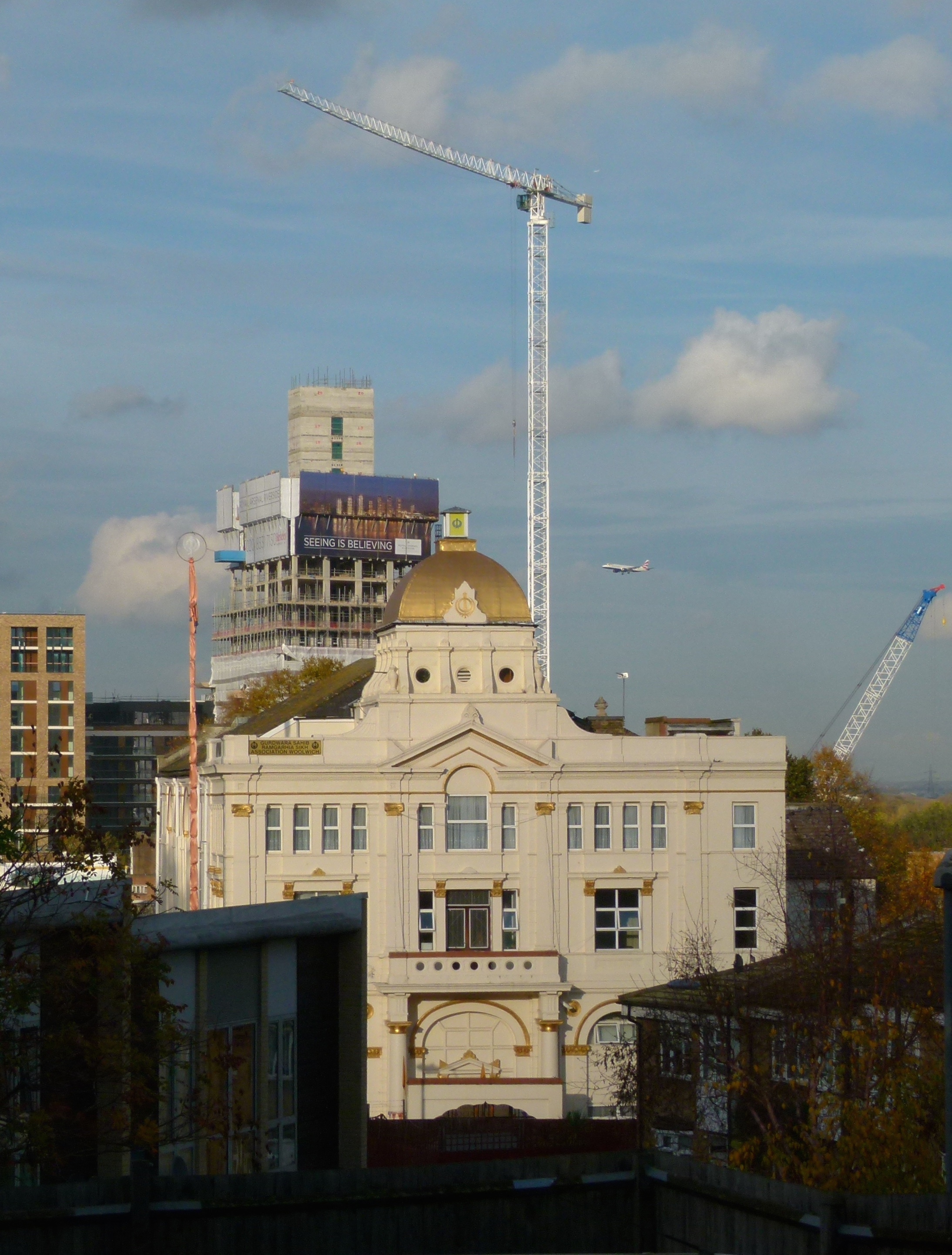
Gurdwara Ramgarhia

== Nature ==
Parks in central Woolwich are generally small. St Mary's Gardens has been laid out as a park in Romantic style on the grounds of the former churchyard of the parish church of St Mary Magdalen. Some historic grave markers have been placed against the peripheral wall. Tom Cribb's memorial, a lion resting its paw on an urn, stands near the northeast entrance. The park features a belvedere which offers views of the River Thames. At the Royal Arsenal, several new parks and gardens have been landscaped but some can only be accessed by residents.

Shrewsbury Park, Plumstead Common, Woolwich Common and Oxleas Wood are situated higher up the hill and are all part of the South East London Green Chain. Repository Woods is a forested part of Woolwich Common. The area around the lake is a military training ground that is not open to the public. The same applies to Mulgrave Pond and Shooters Hill golf course.

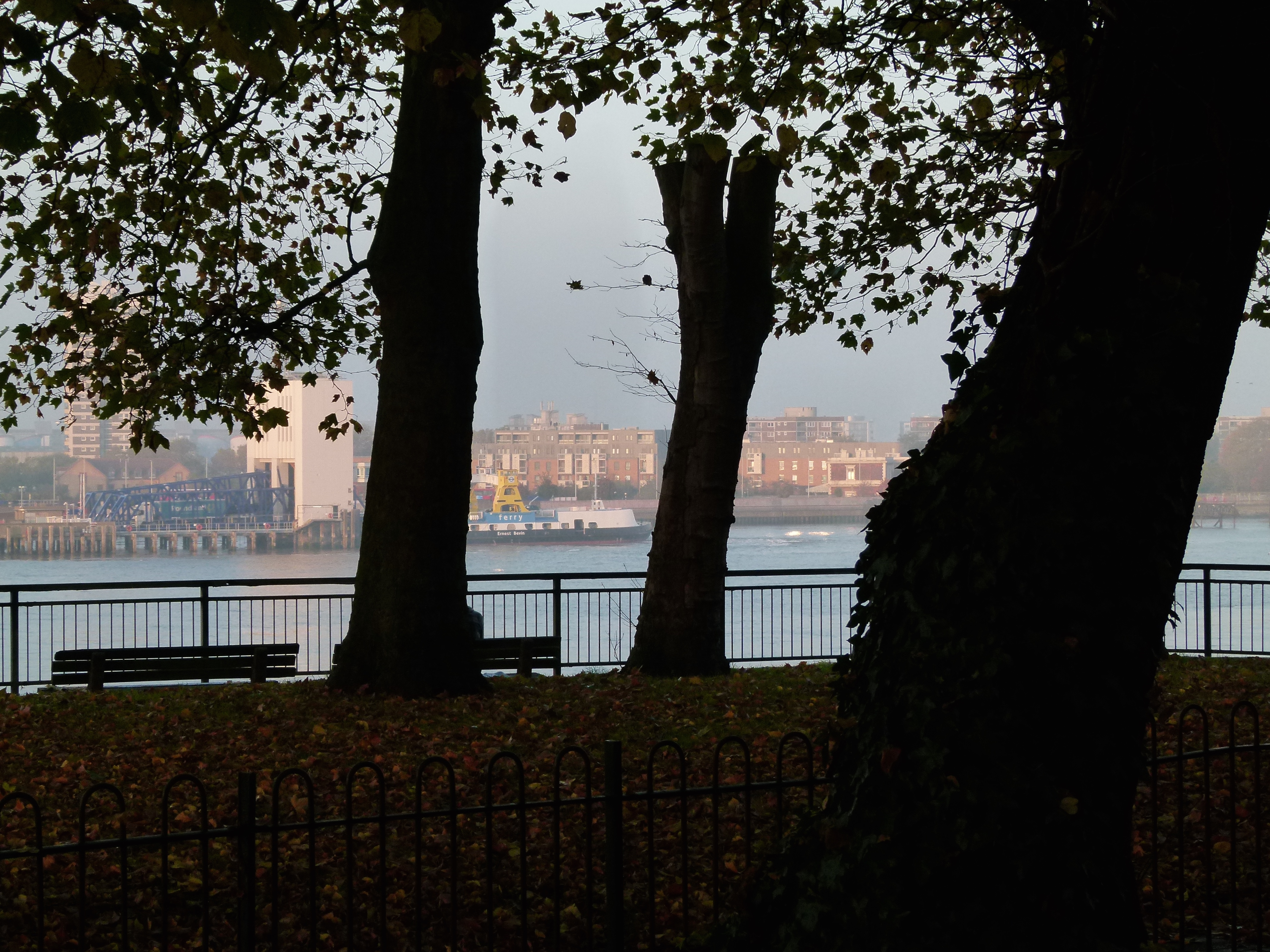
St Mary's Gardens

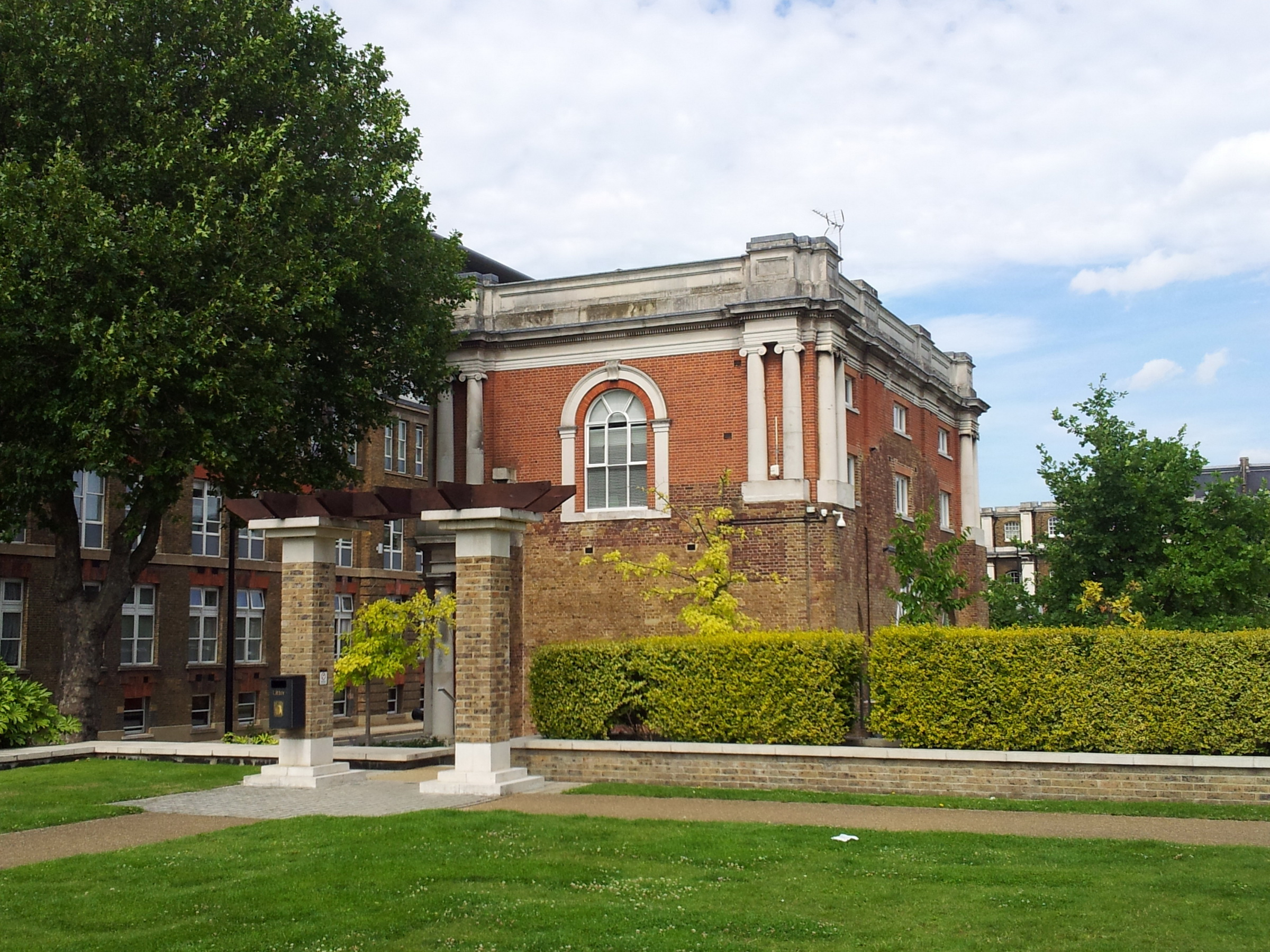
Wellington Park

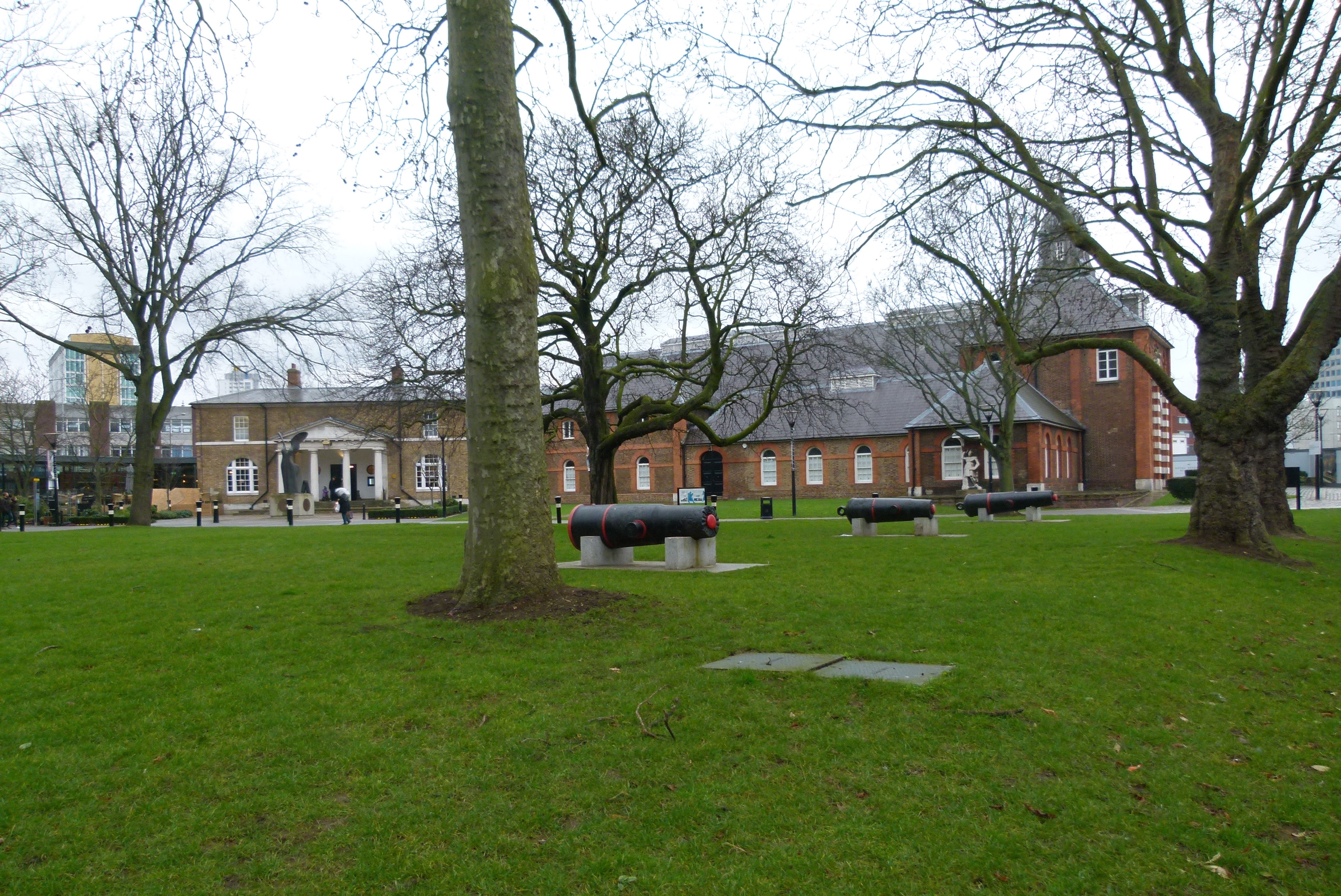
Dial Arch Square

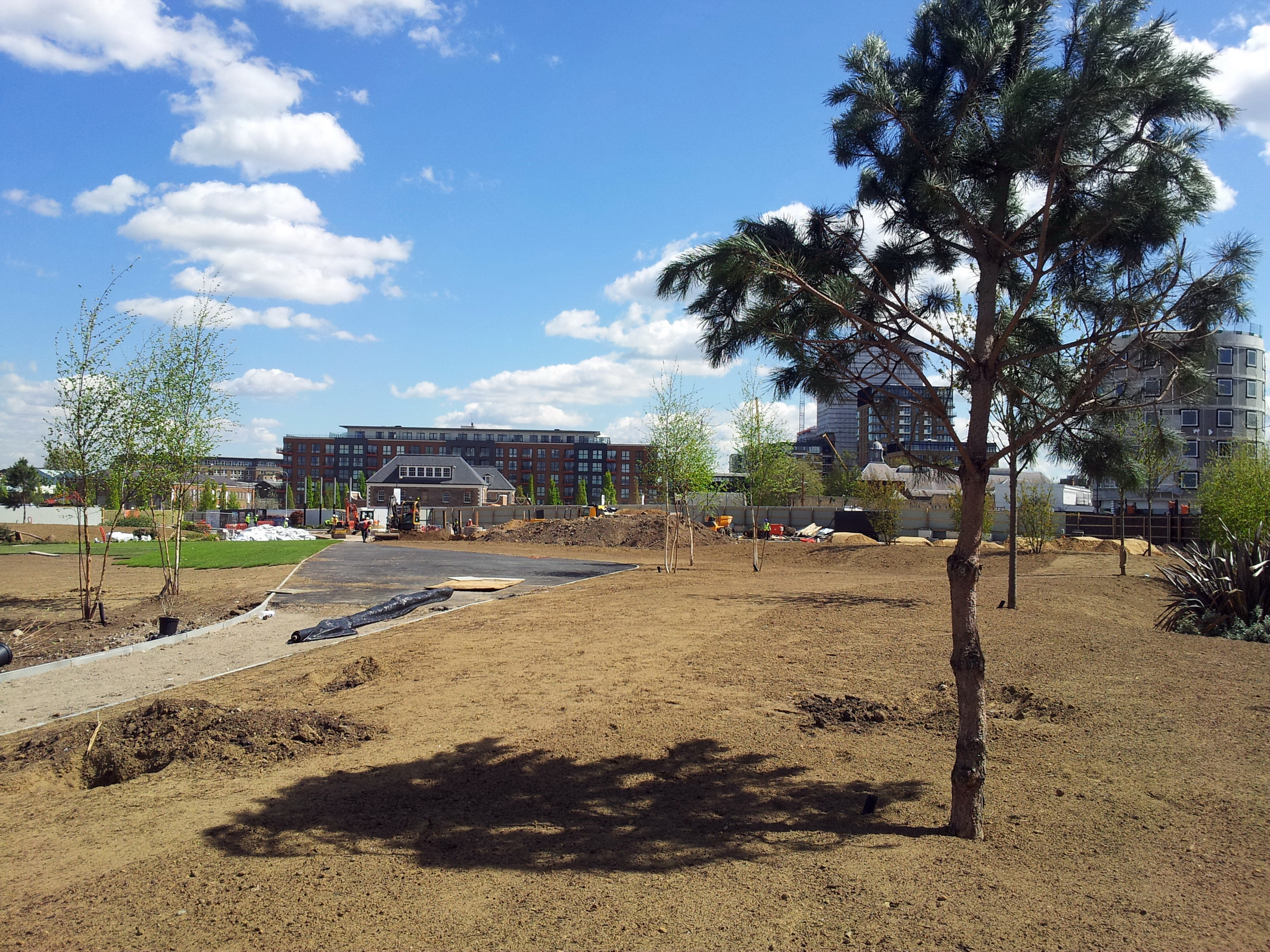
New Riverside Park

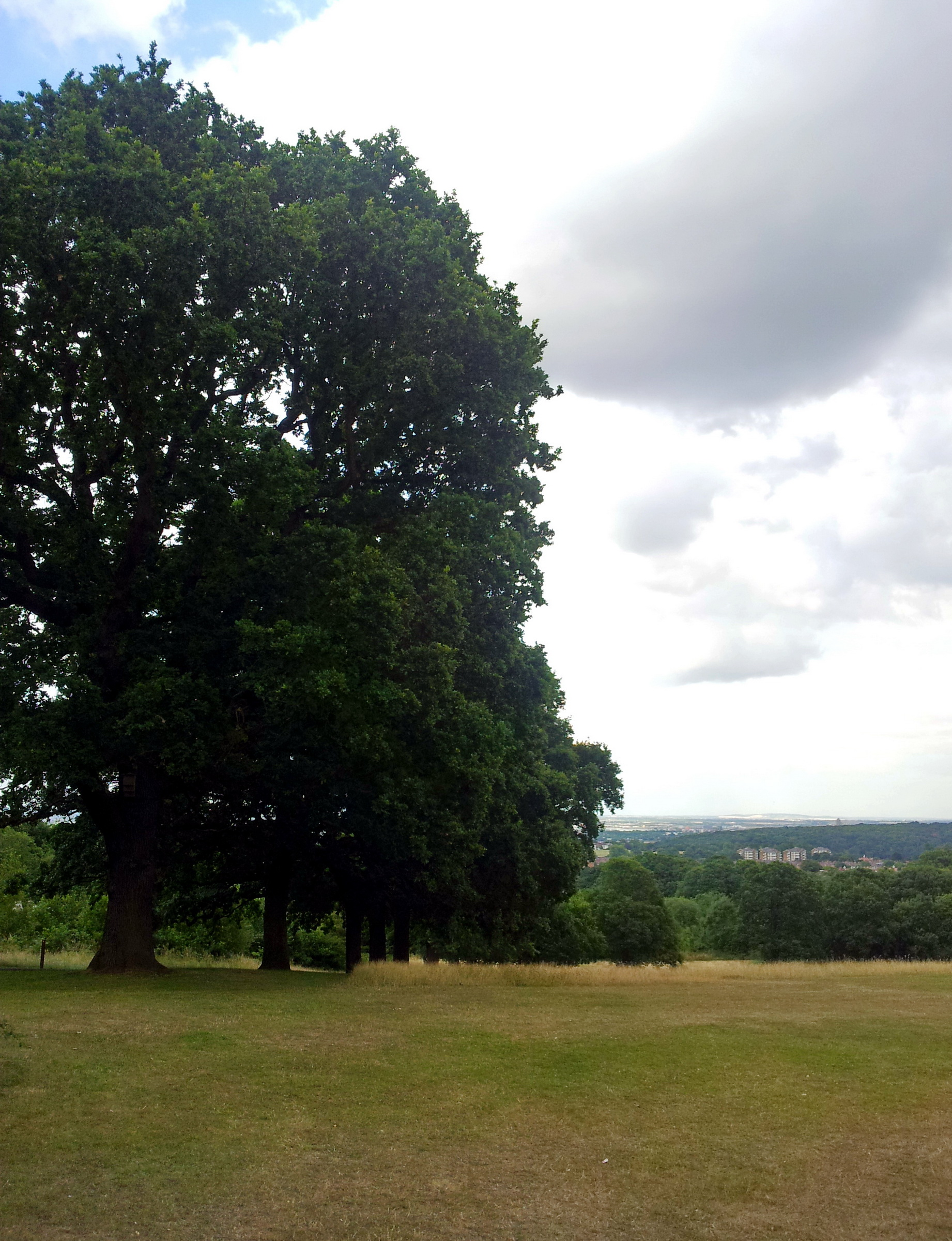
Shrewsbury Park

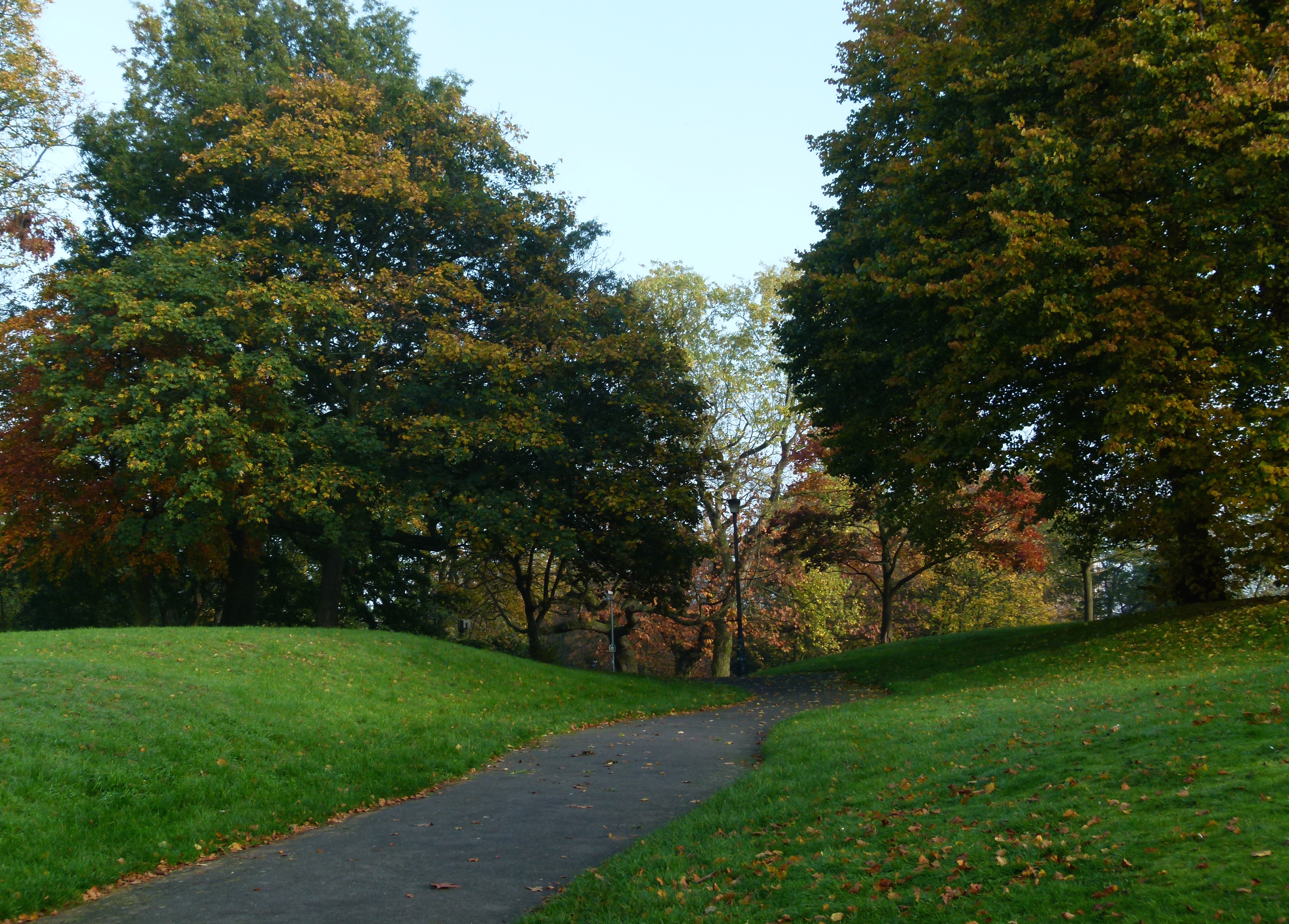
Plumstead Common

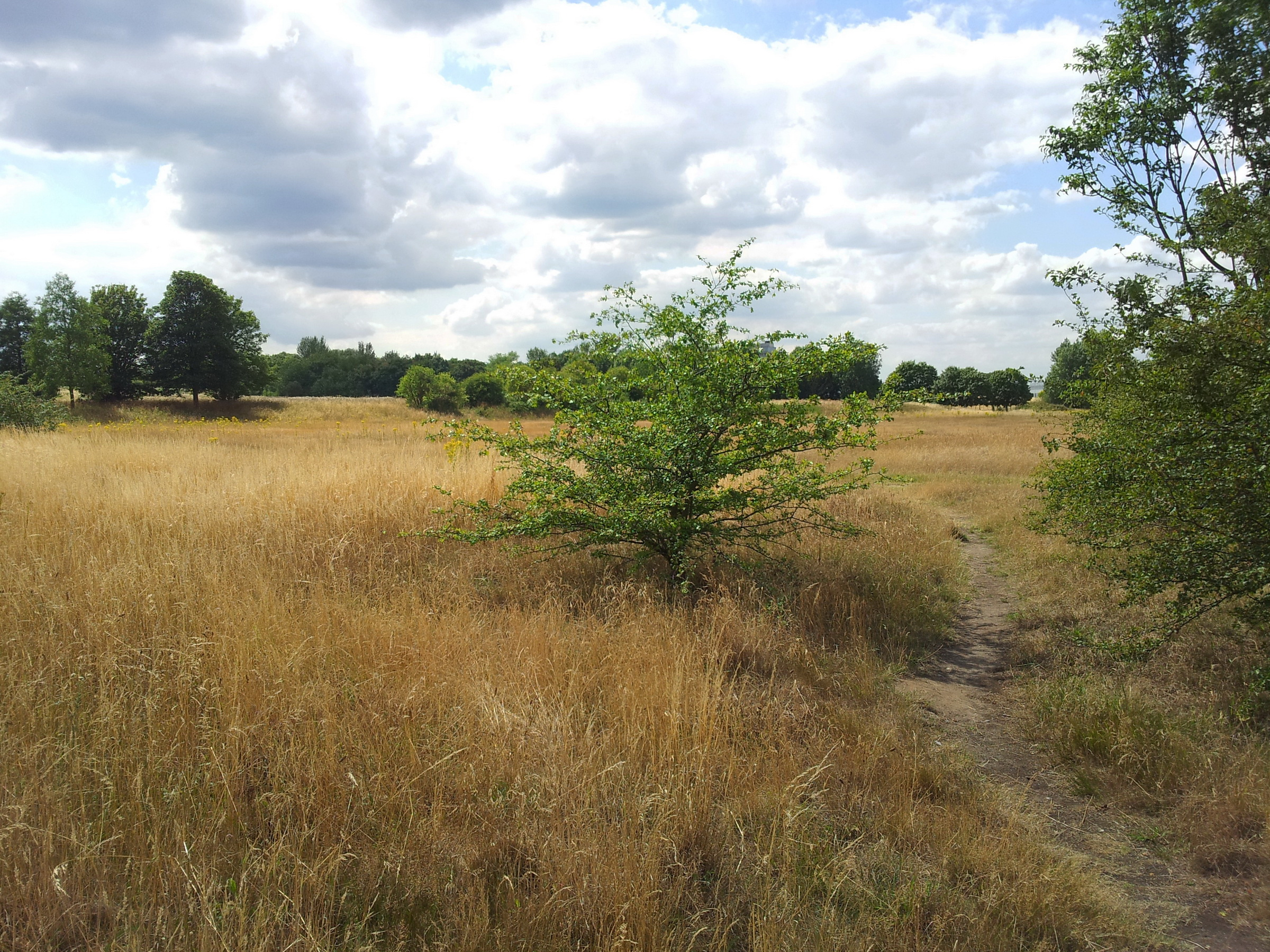
Woolwich Common

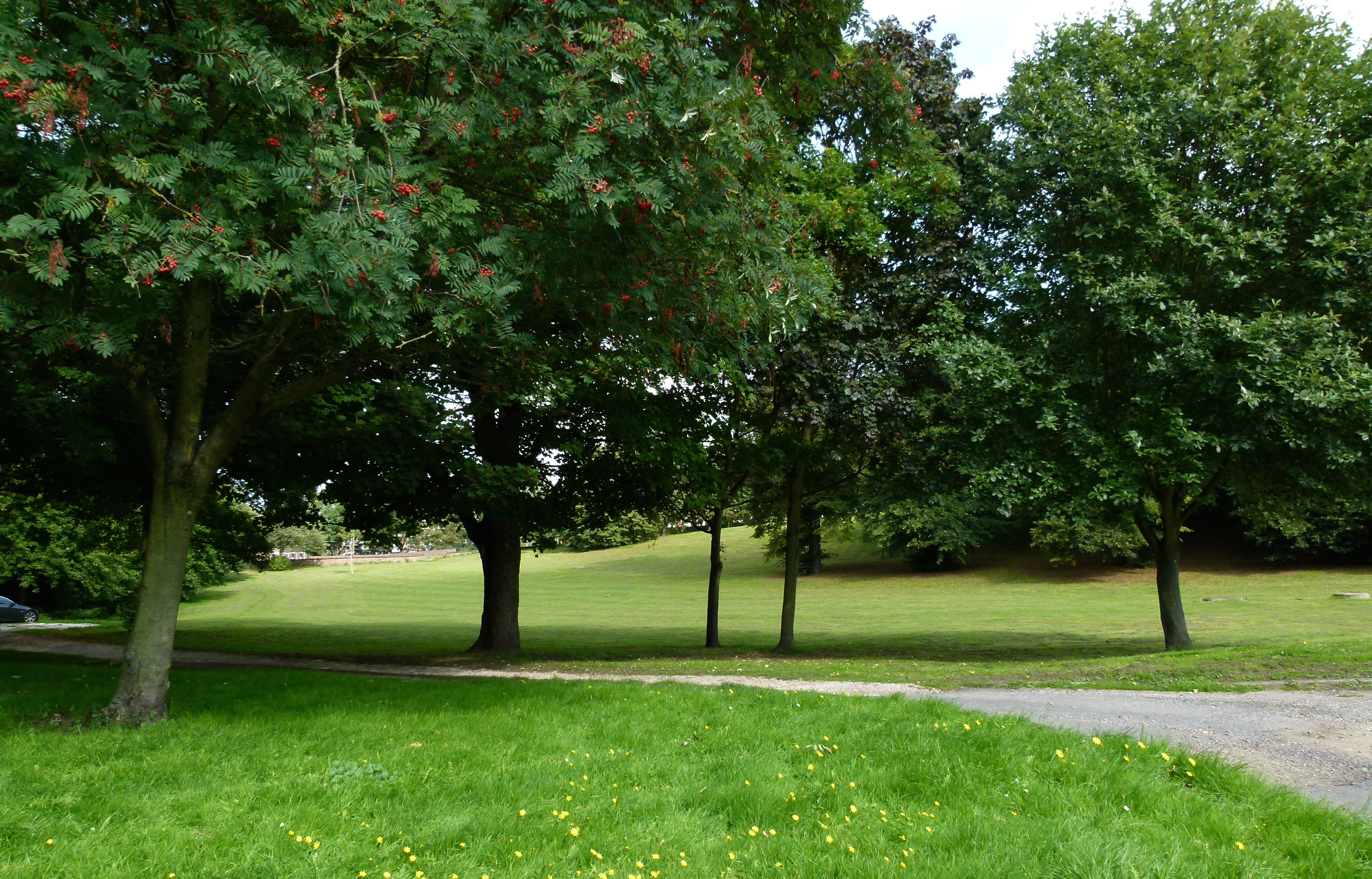
Repository Woods

== Sports and leisure ==
Arsenal F.C. is originally from Woolwich; Charlton Athletic's stadium, The Valley, is approximately 1.2 miles (1.9 km) west of Woolwich. The area also has two Non-League football clubs: Bridon Ropes F.C. and Meridian F.C., who both play at Meridian Sports & Social Club, south of Charlton Park.

Barrack Field at the Royal Artillery Barracks was a famous cricket ground in the 18th century but is now merely used for recreational sports. Royal Arsenal Rugby Club plays rugby here.

From 1988 until late 2025, the Waterfront Leisure Centre, east of the Woolwich Ferry, provided swimming pools and other facilities. It closed on 31 December 2025, and was replaced by a new centre, Woolwich Waves. As of June 2026, the Waterfront was set to be demolished for residential use.

In Charlton Riverside, there is an indoor climbing wall in the Thamesside Studios, off Warspite Road.

== In film ==
Historic footage of the area, including The Valley, is seen in the 1963 film, The Silent Playground. The town was used as a location for the 2006 film Children of Men.

== Education and culture ==
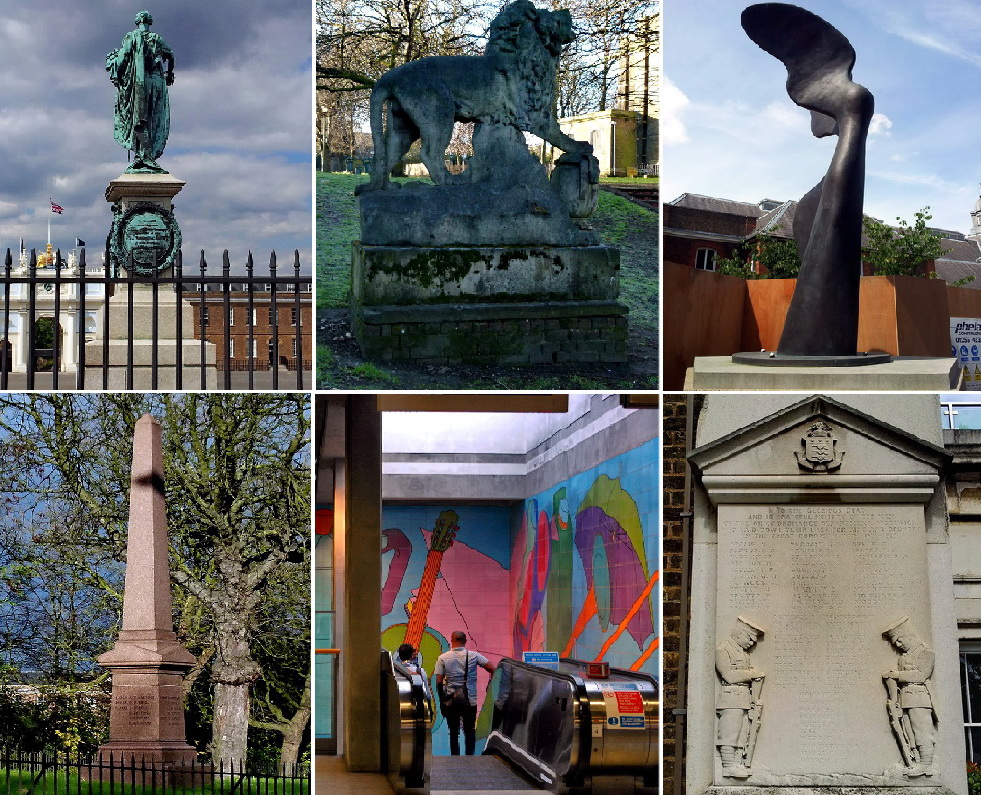
Public art works in Woolwich

The University of Greenwich's dramatic arts department is based in the historic Bathway Quarter in the centre of Woolwich. The old Grand Theatre, which briefly reopened in the 2010s, closed in 2015. The Tramshed, until 1953 an electricity sub-station for the borough's tramways, is a music and entertainment venue run by the Royal Borough of Greenwich. Woolwich currently has no movie theatres. Cinemas are included in the plans for Spray Street quarter and the Island site.

Woolwich has one museum, the Greenwich Heritage Centre at the Royal Arsenal (Firepower – The Royal Artillery Museum closed in 2016 after having been based in Woolwich for almost two centuries). Second Floor Studios in the Woolwich Dockyard area is one of London's largest concentrations of artists' studios. The town has a number of public sculptures: one of Roman origin, several statues and reliefs from the 19th and early 20th centuries, and a number of modern sculptures. One of the Woolwich Arsenal DLR station entrances features a large mural in tiles by Michael Craig-Martin.

== Transport ==
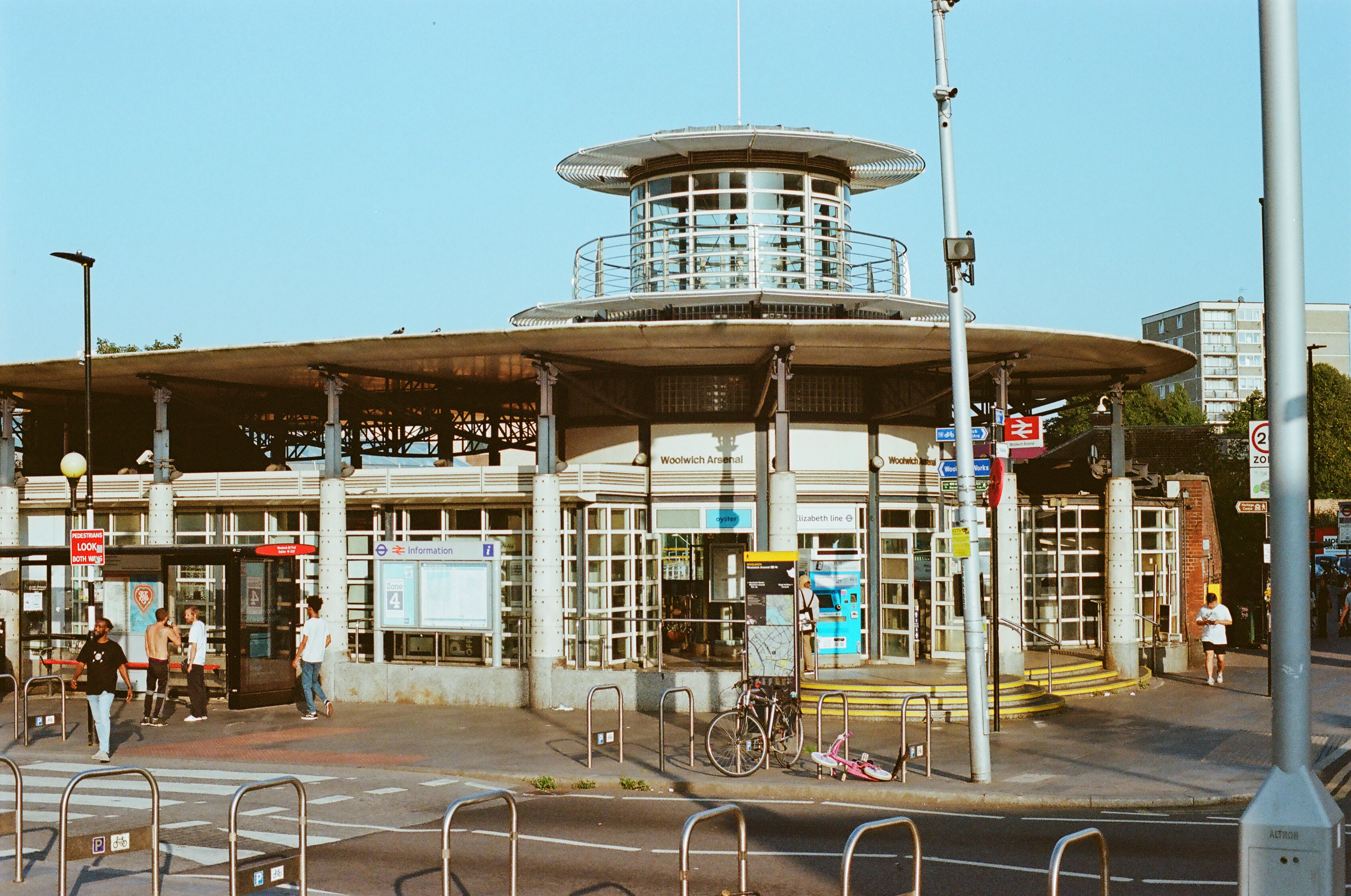
Woolwich Arsenal station

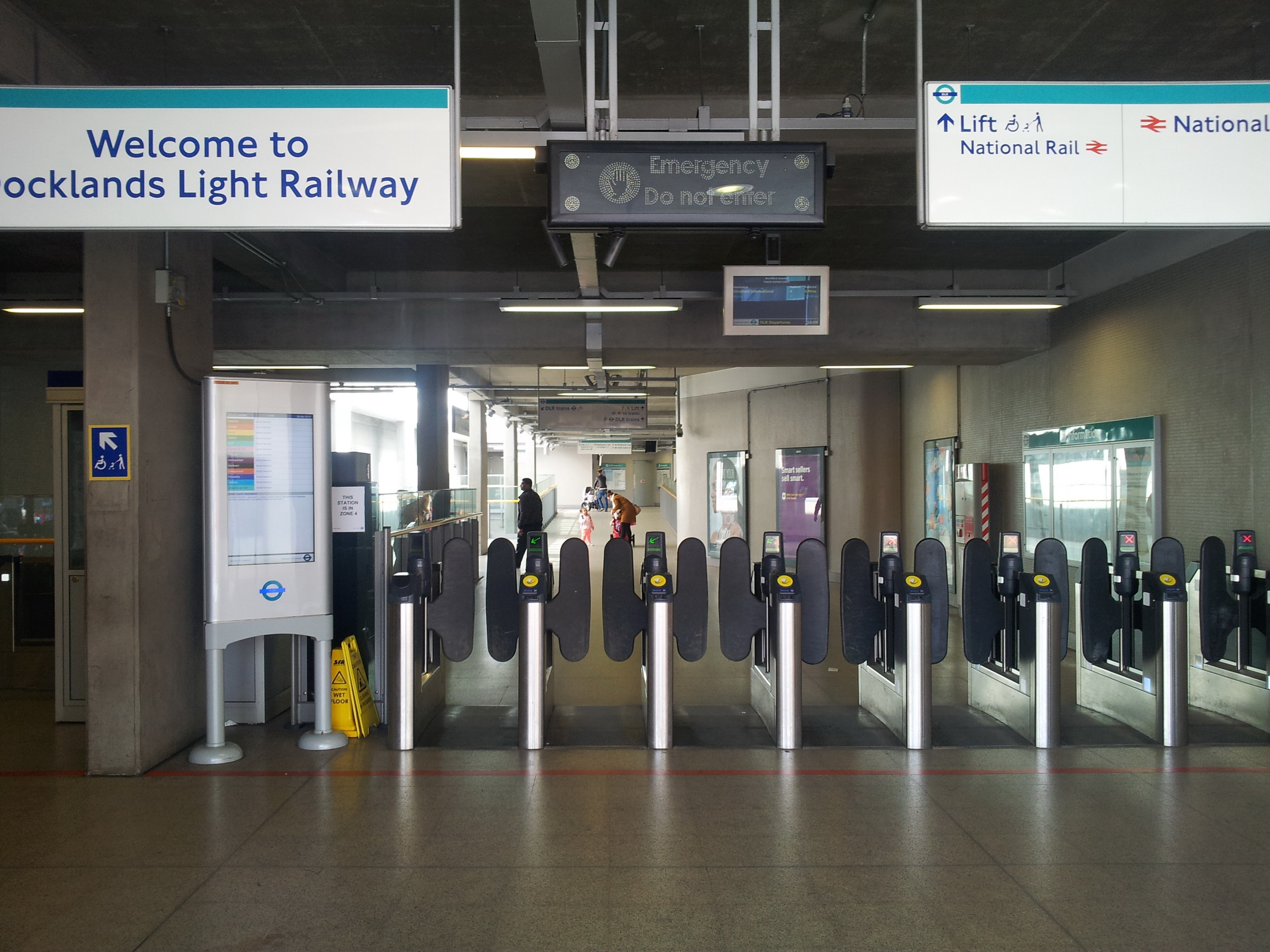
Woolwich Arsenal DLR station

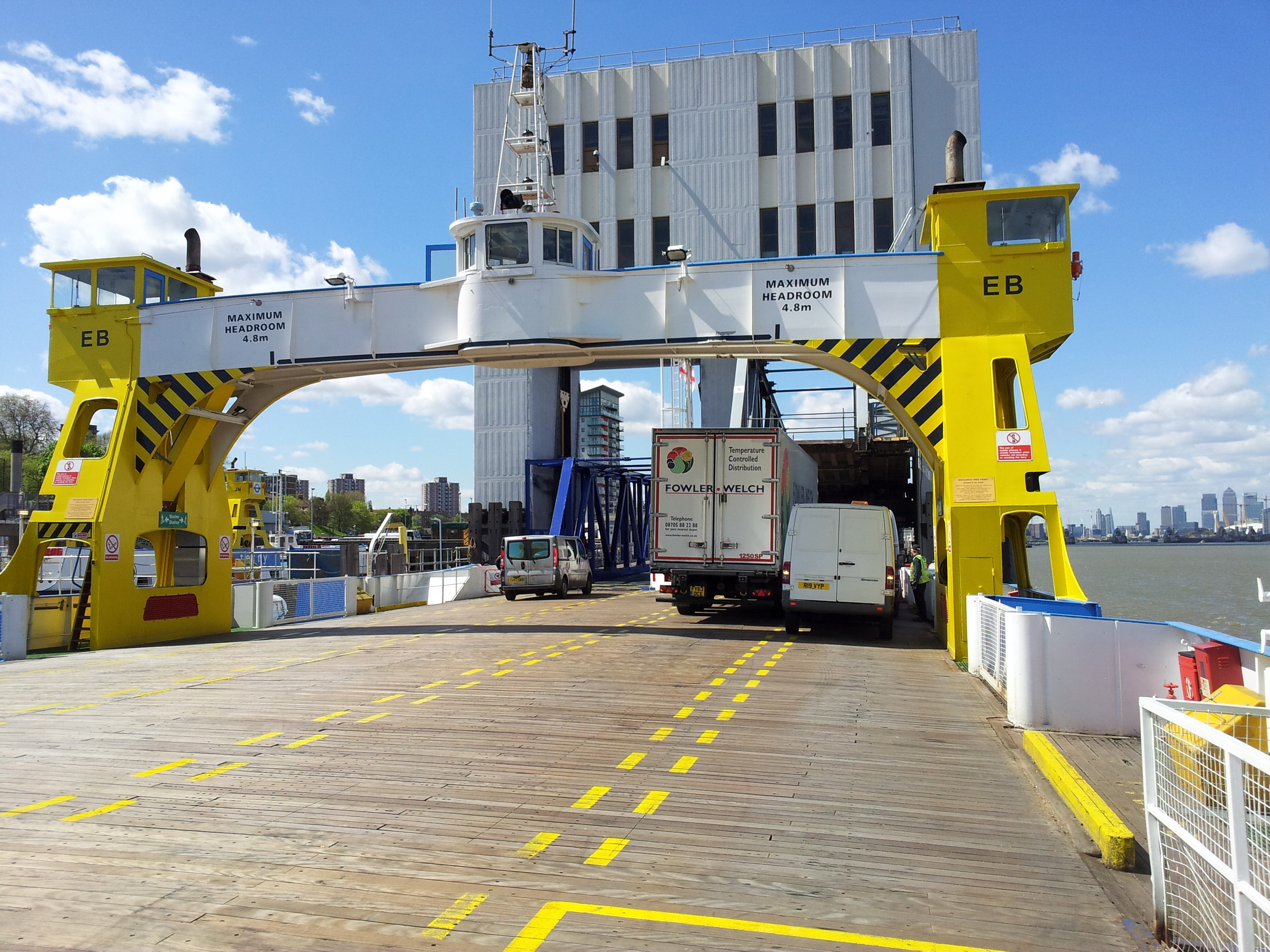
Woolwich Ferry

=== National Rail ===
Woolwich Arsenal and Woolwich Dockyard connect the area with Southeastern services to London Cannon Street via Greenwich, London Charing Cross via Lewisham, Dartford, and Barnehurst (continuing to London Cannon Street via Bexleyheath as part of a loop service), as well as Thameslink services to Luton via Greenwich & London Blackfriars and to Rainham.

=== DLR ===
Woolwich Arsenal connects the area with DLR services to Bank and Stratford International.

=== Elizabeth line ===
Woolwich railway station opened in May 2022 on Elizabeth line with services towards Abbey Wood, Canary Wharf, central London, Reading and Heathrow Airport.

=== Buses ===
Woolwich is served by many London Buses routes connecting it with places including Abbey Wood, Beckenham, Bexleyheath, Blackfen, Blackheath, Bluewater, Catford, Central London Charlton, Chislehurst, Crayford, Crystal Palace, Dartford, Deptford, Elephant & Castle, Elmers End, Eltham, Erith, Greenwich, Lambeth North, Lewisham, Kidbrooke, New Cross, North Greenwich, Old Kent Road, Orpington, Peckham, Plumstead, Sidcup, St Mary Cray, Sydenham, Thamesmead and Welling.

=== Woolwich Ferry ===
The free Woolwich Ferry service operates across the River Thames to North Woolwich in the London Borough of Newham carrying trucks, cars, cyclists and pedestrians during the day until 20:00 on weekdays. A two boat service runs on Mondays to Fridays with weekends being served by a one boat service. The Woolwich foot tunnel is also available for use by pedestrians (and cyclists pushing their cycles) at any time. It is served by lifts during traditional shopping hours.

=== London River Services ===
London River Services, operated by Thames Clippers, provide a peak-hour, daily service to central London (Embankment Pier) from Woolwich Arsenal Pier (adjacent to the Royal Arsenal residential development). The Thames Barrier is located 1 mile (1.6 km) upstream from the tunnel and ferry.

=== Air ===
London City Airport, built in the 1980s, is the nearest airport, located across the River Thames. In 2009, Woolwich received a direct transport link to the airport via the Docklands Light Railway extension to Woolwich Arsenal station.

Heathrow Airport received a direct link to Woolwich in 2022 when the core section of the Elizabeth line opened.

== Notable people ==
- Victor Brooks (1918–2000), actor, born in Woolwich.
- Garry Bushell (born 1955), journalist and political activist, born in Woolwich.
- Anjem Choudary (born 1967) Islamist, founder of al-Muhajiroun and Islam4UK, solicitor, convicted of inviting support for a proscribed organization, namely the Islamic State of Iraq and the Levant, under the Terrorism Act 2000, attended Mulgrave Primary School in Woolwich.
- Tom Cribb (1781–1848), 19th-century bare-knuckle boxer, born in Bristol but resided and died aged 66 in Woolwich, he was buried in St. Mary's churchyard. A road in Woolwich is named after him.
- Stella Duffy (born 1963), novelist and playwright, born in Woolwich later moved to Eltham.
- Bernardine Evaristo (born 1959), writer, raised in Woolwich.
- Julia Fraser (1841–1915), novelist
- Boy George (born 1961), songwriter and lead singer for the band Culture Club, raised in Woolwich.
- Charles George Gordon (1833–1885), general, born in Woolwich.
- Charles Hutton Gregory (1817–1888), civil engineer, born in Woolwich.
- Olinthus Gregory (1774–1841), mathematician (and father of Charles Hutton Gregory), lived and died in Woolwich.
- Joseph Grimaldi (1778–1837), pantomime clown, lived in Woolwich during the early 1830s before moving to Islington.
- Jeremy Healy (born 1962), DJ and member of Haysi Fantayzee, born in Woolwich.
- Charles Hutton (1737–1823), mathematician, lived and died in Woolwich.
- Alice Keppel (1868–1947), society hostess and mistress of King Edward VII, was born at Woolwich Dockyard when her father, Sir William Edmonstone (1810–1888), naval commander and later politician, was Superintendent of the Dockyard.
- George Thomas Landmann (1779–1854), military and civil engineer, born and raised in Woolwich.
- Jonathan Guy Lewis (born 1963), actor, born in Woolwich.
- William Livingstone Robe (1791–1815), army officer, born in Woolwich.
- Richard Lovelace (1618–1657), poet, born in Woolwich.
- Forbes Macbean FRS (1725–1800), army officer, lived and died in Woolwich.
- Carlo Martelli, (born 1935) has lived in Woolwich since the early 1960s.
- Scott Maslen (born 1971), actor and model, born in Woolwich.
- Keith Milow (born in 1945), painter and sculptor, lives in Woolwich.
- Thomas Monaghan (1833–1895), British soldier, recipient of the Victoria Cross, died in Woolwich
- Glenn Morris (1983), footballer, born in Woolwich.
- Noizy (born 1986), Albanian musician and actor, lived in Woolwich.
- John George Pattison (1875–1917), Canadian soldier, recipient of the Victoria Cross, born in Woolwich.
- William Ranwell (1797–1861), artist, lived and died in Woolwich.
- Ray Richardson (born 1964), painter, born and lives in Woolwich.
- Frederick Robe (1801–1871), Governor of South Australia, born in Woolwich.
- William Robe (1765–1820), army officer and architect, born and died in Woolwich.
- John Scott (1757–1832), evangelical and pacifist, born in Woolwich.
- Sylvia Syms (1934–2023), actress, born in Woolwich.
- John Tapner (c. 1823–1854), last person executed in the island of Guernsey, came from Woolwich.
- Glenn Tilbrook (born 1957), guitarist, born in Woolwich.
- Neil Vartan (1962–1994), cricketer, born in Woolwich.
- Lesley Vickerage (born 1961), actress, born in Woolwich.
- George Whale (1849–1925), solicitor and bibliophile, Mayor of Woolwich, founded the Samuel Pepys Club in 1903.
- Mavis Wheeler (1908–1970), socialite who shot her lover Lord Vivian in 1954, born in Woolwich.
- Ian Wright (born 1963) English former footballer and pundit.

== See also ==
- List of people from Greenwich
- List of schools in Greenwich
- Royal Ordnance Factory
- Princess Alice – a passenger steamer sunk off North Woolwich pier on 3 September 1878 (a memorial to those lost can be found in Woolwich Old Cemetery, Kings Highway, Plumstead)
