= Murder of Sabina Nessa =

2021 murder in London, England

- Nessa (pictured in c. 2014)
- Date: 17 September 2021
- Location: Kidbrooke, London Borough of Greenwich
- Convicted: Koci Selamaj
- Charges: Murder
- Verdict: Pleaded guilty
- Sentence: Life imprisonment (36-year minimum term)

On the evening of 17 September 2021, Sabina Nessa, a 28-year-old woman was murdered in south east London. Her body was found the following day in Cator Park, Greenwich, having been beaten and strangled.

Koci Selamaj, an Albanian-born man residing in Eastbourne, East Sussex, pleaded guilty to her murder in February 2022 and was sentenced to life imprisonment in April 2022.

== Background ==
Sabina Nessa (born 1992/1993) was raised in Sandy, Bedfordshire, England, with her older sister.

She graduated in sociology from the University of Greenwich in 2014 before gaining her PGCE from the University of Bedfordshire in 2020. She was a teacher at Rushey Green Primary School in Lewisham, South East London, and had plans to spend some time teaching in the UAE. She was 28 years old at the time of her death.

Koci Selamaj (born 1985) is Albanian-born, and had undertaken work at a garage and as a delivery driver. At the time of Nessa's murder, Selamaj was living in Eastbourne, East Sussex.

== Incident ==
On 17 September 2021, Selamaj checked in to The Grand Hotel in Eastbourne, having booked the one-night stay earlier that week. He then drove his Nissan Micra to London, and was seen on CCTV on foot in Cator Park, Kidbrooke, Greenwich at 20:00 BST.

At 20:30, Nessa left her home in Astell Road, Kidbrooke on a five-minute walk to meet a friend at the Depot pub in Kidbrooke Village, near Kidbrooke railway station. While Nessa was walking through Cator Park, Selamaj struck her unconscious with a blunt instrument, thought to be a traffic triangle, before dragging her into bushes where it is alleged she was strangled. Selamaj was seen at 21:00 before leaving London. En route back to Eastbourne, Selamaj stopped near Tunbridge Wells, Kent, where he disposed of the traffic triangle in the River Teise. He arrived at the hotel in Eastbourne shortly after 00:00 on 18 September.

Although Nessa did not arrive at the pub, she was not reported missing. At 17:30 on 18 September, a dog walker found Nessa's body under vegetation in the park.

== Legal proceedings ==
On 23 September, police in Lewisham arrested a 38-year-old man on suspicion of murder. Three days later, Selamaj was arrested in Eastbourne, also on suspicion of murder. He had been identified via CCTV footage of the attack.

Selamaj was charged with murder on 27 September, and appeared at Central London's Old Bailey via videolink from HM Prison Wormwood Scrubs in White City, West London, on 30 September. The court heard that while Selamaj had repeatedly struck Nessa with a blunt instrument, a post mortem was inconclusive as to the cause of death.

On 16 December 2021, Selamaj pleaded not guilty to murder, while admitting that he was responsible for Nessa's death. A pre-trial hearing was set for 25 February 2022, and a trial scheduled to last approximately two weeks was set for June 2022. On 25 February 2022, Selamaj pleaded guilty to murder at the start of his trial at the Old Bailey. On 7 April, he was sentenced to life imprisonment with a minimum term of 36 years. This sentence means he will not become eligible to be considered for parole until 30 April 2057. Selamaj was not in court to hear his sentence.

== Reactions ==
Nessa's murder was not initially reported widely in the media, and journalist Katrina Mirpuri created a viral post on Instagram, calling out the lack of media attention which eventually spearheaded the mass media coverage and brought more pressure for action to tackle violence against women in London. Mayor of London Sadiq Khan described violence against women as a national "epidemic".

Her murder was compared to those of Bibaa Henry and Nicole Smallman in June 2020 and Sarah Everard in March 2021. As in the case of Henry and Smallman, Nessa's death raised concerns that the killings of women of colour were still taken less seriously by the police. Nessa's sister, Jebina Yasmin Islam, said that while Clive Efford MP had supported her family, more senior officeholders had been "useless". She suggested that Priti Patel was unsupportive and had used Nessa's name for publicity, saying "You haven't even bothered to ask [what the family are going through] since the death of my sister. Lack of support from yourself and Boris Johnson just shows how 'important' it is to tackle male violence to you guys". Islam complained the lack of support for her family was due to their ethnicity.

Vigils were held in several cities to honour her life. Her family spoke at a rally at East London Mosque attended by faith leaders, women's groups and local politicians, including Rushanara Ali MP. A video message from Zara Mohammed, Secretary-General of the Muslim Council of Britain was played at the mosque, and a candle was lit at 10 Downing Street. A spokesperson from Citizens UK observed that the day Nessa was killed was the same day the government released its strategy on tackling violence against women and girls.

Dame Vera Baird attended the vigil for Nessa in London and commented that societal change is needed and the police must do more. Also in attendance at the London vigil were Zarah Sultana, Mandu Reid, Rabina Khan and Apsana Begum. Flowers were laid on behalf of the Duchess of Cambridge.

In 2022, Islam was chosen as one of the BBC's 100 Women for her campaign to improve the safety of women.
