= Ferrier Estate =

Housing estate in Kidbrooke, London

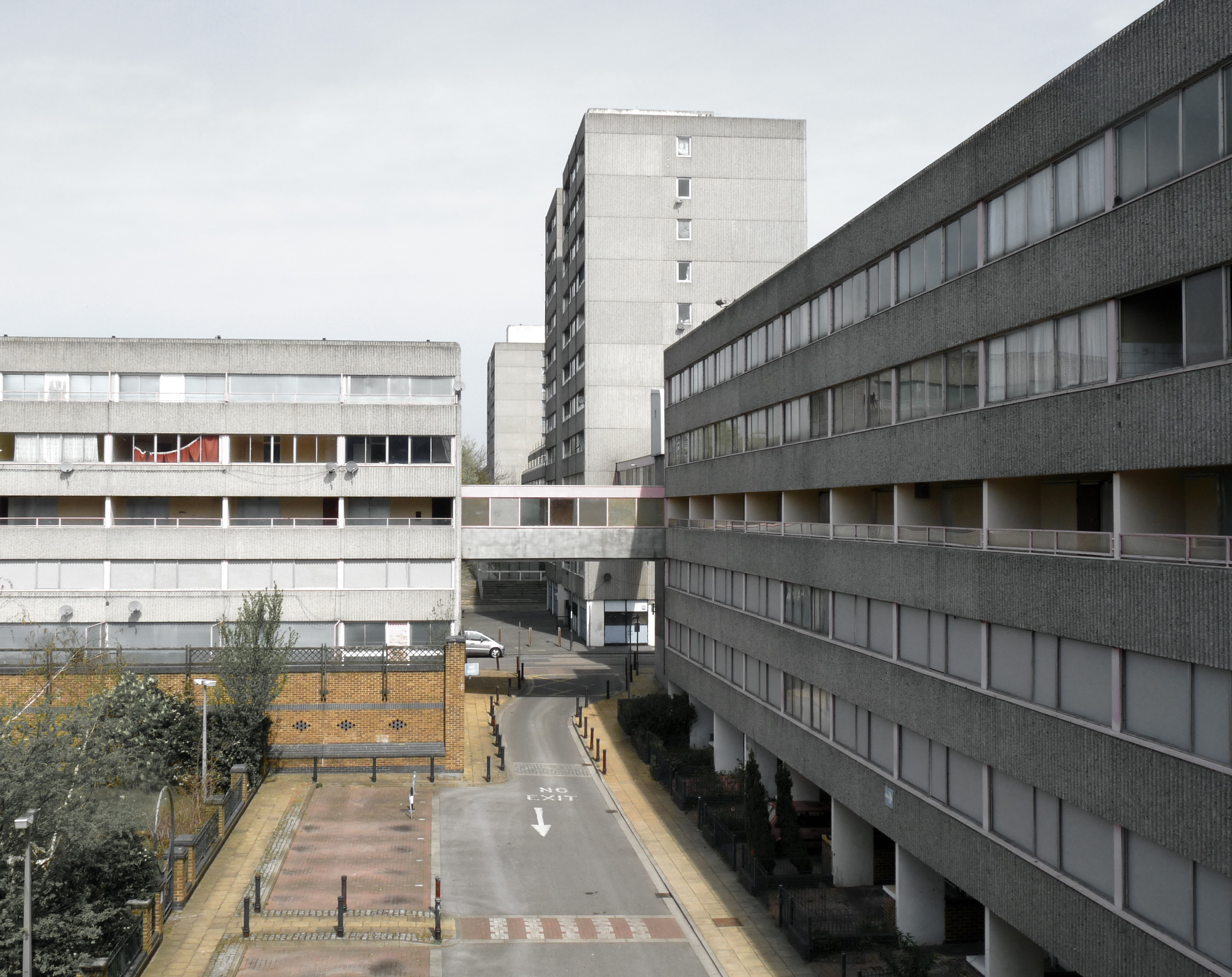
- Lebrun Square – part of the Ferrier Estate
- Interactive map of Ferrier Estate

General information
- Location: Kidbrooke, Greenwich, London, England
- Coordinates: 51.460°N 0.027°E
- Status: Demolished

Construction
- Constructed: 1968–1972

Listing
- Demolished: 2009–2012

Other information
- Governing body: Royal Borough of Greenwich
- Famous residents: Richard Reid

The Ferrier Estate was a large housing estate located in Kidbrooke, Greenwich, south London. Built as social housing between 1968 and 1972, it was demolished as part of the Kidbrooke Vision scheme between 2009 and 2012 and replaced with housing and retail space known as Kidbrooke Village.

The estate was located to the south of Kidbrooke railway station and the A2 Rochester Way and to the north of the A20, to the east of Blackheath and to the west of the border of Eltham.

== History ==
The estate was constructed by the Greater London Council between 1968 and 1972 to the east of Blackheath on brownfield land from the former RAF Kidbrooke base. It was built on two sites. Site A was approved in 1967 with construction of five 12-storey towers (Clegg, Crozier, Goldmark, Leclair and Sala Houses) commencing one year later. Site B was approved in 1970 with construction of six 12-storey towers (Felton, Ronald, Stainer, Standish, Sterling and Wixom Houses) commencing the same year.

A typical example of system built social housing in the United Kingdom from the 1950s to the 1970s, the Ferrier Estate was built using a system of precast concrete panels that were usually manufactured on site. It was a method similar to that used in the construction of the Thamesmead estate enabling residential buildings to be erected quickly.

== Social issues ==
Security keypads routinely went unrepaired and in 1999 a property-marking initiative was started at the Ferrier Estate by the British Security Industry and Prince Michael of Kent due to the notoriety of the estate as a burglary blackspot. This was a small help to the majority law-abiding residents.

The Ferrier Estate was multi-ethnic, with a concentrated population of refugee families whereas the rest of the south of the borough of Greenwich remained mainly white British. Allocations decisions made by the London County Council and Greenwich Council as well as the Government Care in the Community Policy resulted in troubled and vulnerable tenants being housed on the estate with inadequate support.

There was press speculation about a terror cell and terrorist training facility located on the Ferrier Estate following the arrest of the "Shoe Bomber" Richard Reid in 2001. Reid's origins were traced back to the Ferrier Estate; he attended the nearby Thomas Tallis School.

== Regeneration ==
From 2009 onwards, the Ferrier Estate began to be demolished as part of a regeneration scheme, becoming Kidbrooke Village. The Village is built by Berkeley Homes and when complete will comprise 4,398 new homes, 300,000 sq ft of commercial and retail space, a 100-acre park, a school, a transport interchange and a village centre.

=== Timeline of developments ===
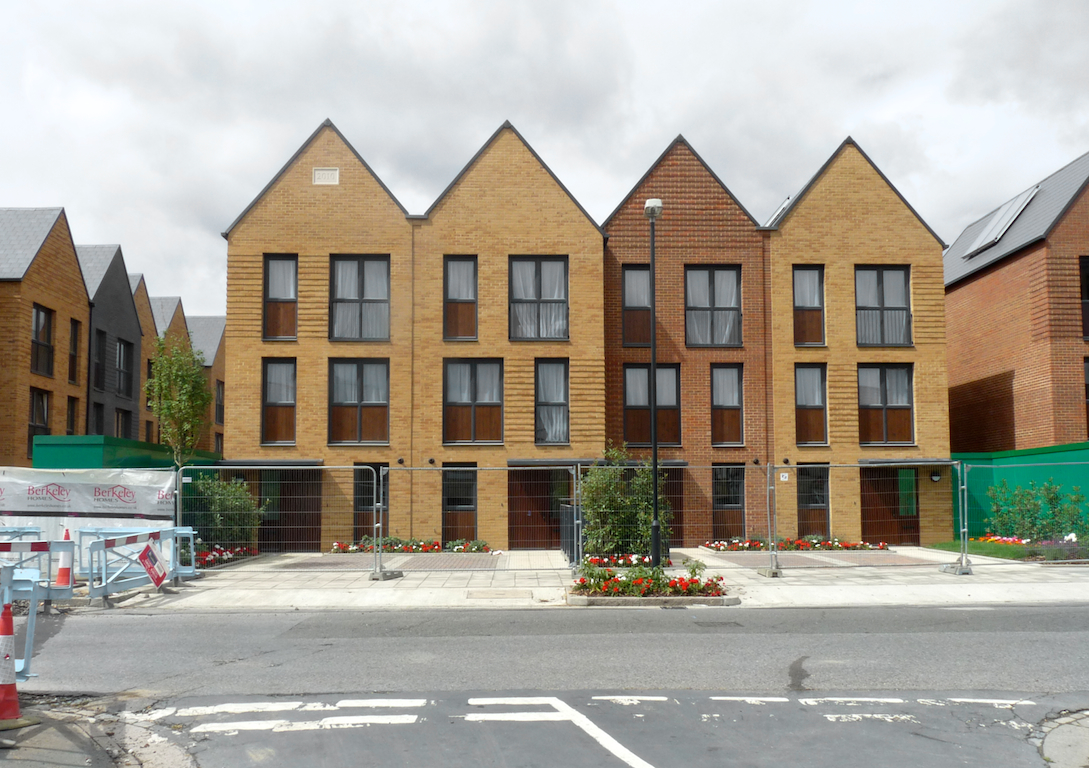
The first completed units of Phase 1 of the Kidbrooke Regeneration

1999 – 2003 Detailed work was carried out by Greenwich Council to assess the future of the Ferrier Estate and full-scale regeneration was concluded as the best option.

July 2004 The Kidbrooke Vision scheme was given approval by the government.

January 2006 Berkeley Homes and Southern Housing were chosen as developers for the Kidbrooke Vision scheme.

November 2007 Lifschutz Davidson Sandilands were selected by Berkeley homes as architects to design the regeneration masterplan.

March 2009 Demolition began on the Ferrier Estate.

April 2009 Lifschutz Davidson Sandilands were appointed as architects of Kidbrooke Village by Greenwich Council.

June 2009 Final planning permission for Kidbrooke Village was granted by the Mayor of London.

September 2009 A ground-breaking ceremony for Phase 1 of Kidbrooke Village took place, heralding the start of construction.

January 2010 Demolition began on the Ferrier Estate. A notice was served stating that demolition would be finished by 25 January 2012, a reasonable period within which to carry out the proposed demolition.

March 2010 Planning permission for Phase 2 of Kidbrooke Village, Blackheath Quarter, was approved by Greenwich Council.

August 2011 Much of the Ferrier Estate had been demolished, particularly to the west of Kidbrooke Park Road, although some residents still awaited rehousing. Apartments and houses in the first phase of Kidbrooke Village, City Point, were occupied. The first phase was built on the former Harrow Meadow football ground located in the southeast of the development area.

2013 Demolition of the Ferrier Estate was completed enabling construction of the next phase of Kidbrooke Village.

== Transport ==
=== Buses ===
The estate was served by London Buses routes 178 and B16. Routes 132, 286 and 386 ran nearby.

=== National Rail ===
The nearest station was Kidbrooke for Southeastern services towards Barnehurst, Dartford, London Charing Cross and London Victoria.

== See also ==
- Aylesbury Estate
- Heygate Estate
- Kidbrooke Village
