= Elsa Mahler =

Russian-born Swiss scholar

- Born: Elsa-Eugenie Mahler; 15 November 1882; Moscow, Russia
- Died: 30 June 1970 (aged 87); Riehen, (BS), Switzerland
- Occupations: Teacher (school and university); University professor (University of Basel)
- Parent(s): Josef Mathias Eduard Mahler; Louise Sivers

Elsa-Eugenie Mahler (15 November 1882 - 30 June 1970) was a Russian-born scholar of Slavic studies and folk arts who came to Switzerland in 1919/20 and was refused permission to return home by the new Soviet government. In 1938 she became the first woman to be appointed to a professorship at the University of Basel.

== Life ==
Elsa-Eugenie Mahler was born in Moscow where her father Josef Mathias Eduard Mahler, a merchant-engineer originally from Switzerland, had settled. Her mother, born Louise Sivers, came from the Baltic German community. Mahler attended school in Moscow. She then went on to pursue her further education at the Philology-History department of the so-called Bestuzhev Courses in Saint Petersburg, which was the largest and most prominent education academy in the entire empire - and according to at least one source the only such institution - that admitted women. She then travelled to the west, studying classical philology and Art history at Berlin and Munich, but she returned to Saint Petersburg in 1913 without having completed a degree course. The First World War broke out in August 1914 and she spent the next few years as a teacher, working in a succession of Saint Petersburg schools. She continued to teach in Petrograd during the Russian Revolution and during the early part of the ensuing civil war, until the schools were closed down.

Only in 1919 did she embark on an academic career, accepting a position as an assistant at the Russian Academy of Sciences back in Moscow, responsible for the antiquities collection. In 1920 she undertook a "further training holiday" in Switzerland, and when she wanted to return to what by now had become the Soviet Union the authorities there refused to let her back. Presumably they had decided that she should be deported. So she remained in Basel.

Having embarked on an academic career the previous year, Elsa Mahler was determined to pursue it, but not in the subjects she had hitherto studied. Instead she turned to Russian studies. Her provenance and upbringing, education and experience of teaching all provided important support for this. The route she followed was far from conventional, however. In 1924 she received her doctorate from Basel University in exchange for a dissertation on the trade in ancient Megaran ceramic beakers. Although her dissertation was based on archaeology, while she was producing it she was also trying to obtain a university post as a lecturer in Russian. In April 1923 she was successful, and now followed her chosen career with renewed tenacity. She passed her habilitation in 1928, also at Basel, which under most circumstances opened the way for a long-term academic career. Her dissertation, this time, concerned "The Russian death chant". For the next ten years she worked at the university as a Privatdozentin (loosely, "tutor"). In 1938 she was given an extraordinary professorship at the University of Basel, becoming the university's first female professor.

== Teaching and research ==
For more than forty years Elsa Mahler taught the Russian language, literature and art. Even after becoming a professor, she still continued to provide language teaching at all levels. Generations of students from a diverse range of academic disciplines, and many others who had no curriculum requirement to do so, were introduced to the Russian language by her or were helped to build on existing knowledge of it. Between 1929 and 1945 with all the countries surrounding Switzerland engaged in intense warfare in alliance with or in opposition to the Soviet Union, Russian language skills were in particular demand, in 1944 she published a Russian language textbook. She followed this up in 1946 with a "Russian Reader".

Her lectures embraced the entire range of Russian studies. However, the principal focus was on nineteenth and twentieth century Russian literature. She embarked on a book project, a History of Russian Literature with Biographical Portraits of the Major Figures, but this remained unfinished at her death.

At first glance, it is remarkable how few of Mahler's many students ever received a degree. The explanation lies in the course structures at Basel University during much of the time that Mahler taught there. Russian studies was treated as a fringe subject, and no "first degrees" in it were awarded. Those of her students who did graduate did so by means of a doctorate, which normally required several additional years of study. Two of her students who did graduate nevertheless deserve a mention: Rudolf Bächtold taught at Basel University between 1953 and 1983, appointed in 1963 to a professorship in the History and Languages of the Slavic peoples. Robin Kemball worked as Professor of Russian Studies at the University of Lausanne between 1970 and 1987.

The continuing presence of the Soviet army in large parts of central Europe and the increasingly stark Cold War tensions of the later 1940s led to an increased interest from the politicians across western Europe in university-level Russian studies. Just as Elizabeth Hill was able to establish a formidable Department of Slavic Studies at Cambridge in England, so at Basel the subject received increased recognition. Until 1949 Elsa Mahler is described in records as head of the university's "Russian Library". In 1949 she becomes identified as head of "Russian Seminars". In 1958/59, five years after her official retirement (although she was still teaching) the "Russian Seminars" were expanded, becoming the "Slavic Seminars".

Her own research choices appeared idiosyncratic to some. She became increasingly focused on collecting Russian folk songs. Her 1936 book "Die russische Totenklage", a greatly expanded version of her habilitation dissertation, depended heavily on written sources, her two other major works were both based on her own visits, during the late 1930s, to the "Pečoryland", which the Treaty of Tartu had left as a linguistically and culturally Russian enclave within Estonia, which had been an independent republic since 1920. The first of these books, "Altrussische Lieder aus dem Pečoryland" (1951, "Old Russian songs from the Pečoryland"), is far more than a song collection, being a study of songs and their incorporation and use in daily life, with portraits of singers, texts and melodies. The second book, "Die russischen dörflichen Hochzeitsbräuche" (1960, "Russian village wedding customs") (dedicated to Basel University in celebration of its 500h anniversary) has been described as "an early controversial folkloric monograph on gender issues".
