= Sutcliffe Park =

Public park in Eltham, London, England

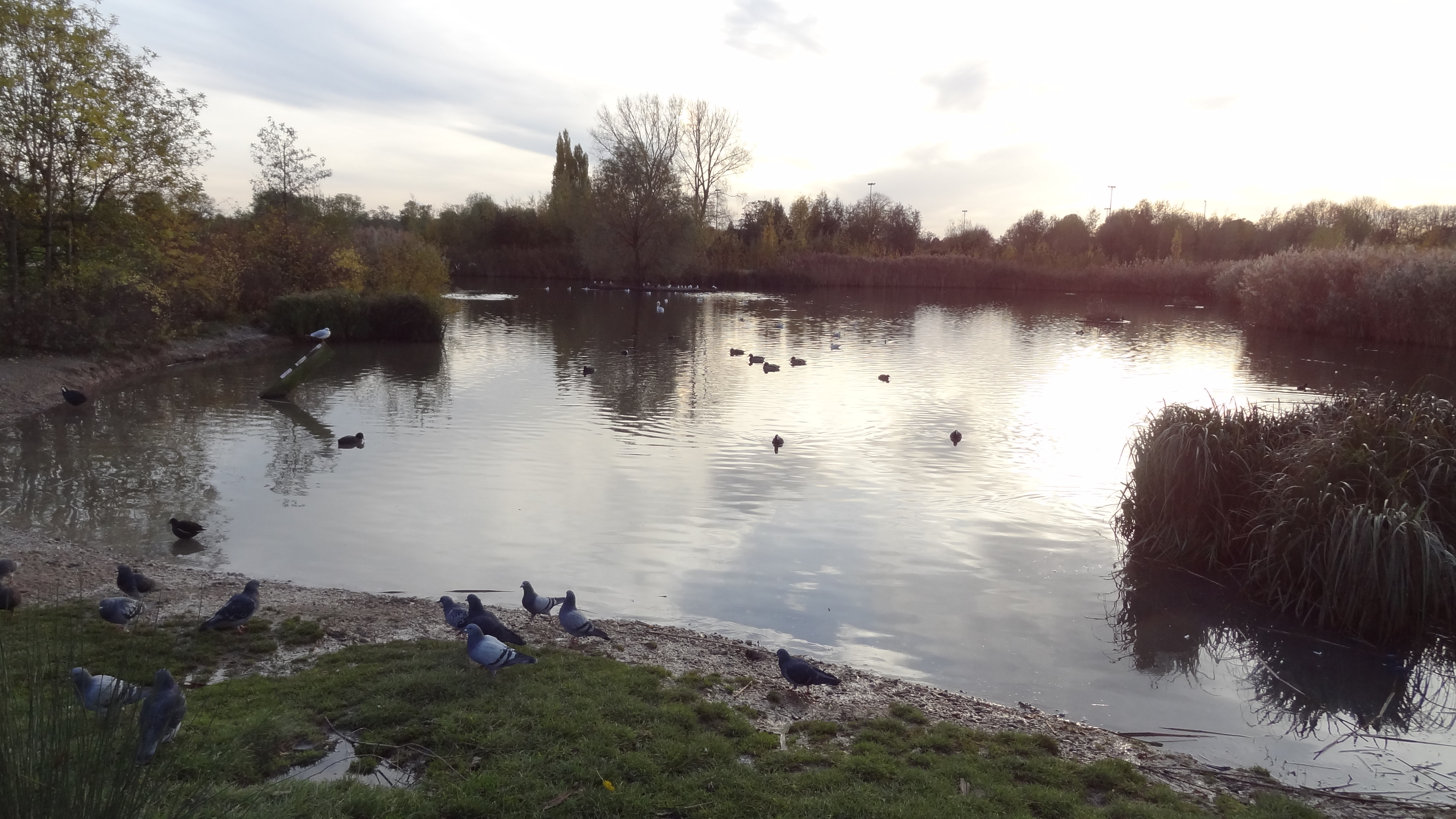
- The lake in Sutcliffe Park

- Location within Greater London
- Type: Public park
- Location: Eltham/Horn Park in the Royal Borough of Greenwich, England
- Coordinates: 51°27′18″N 0°01′44″E
- Area: 41.26 acres (16.70 ha)
- Created: 1937
- Operator: Royal Borough of Greenwich
- Status: Open year round
- Awards: Green Flag Award 2012-2013
- Public transit: Buses, 122, 178, 321, 621, B16, N21, Kidbrooke railway station
- Website: www.royalgreenwich.gov.uk/directory_record/3791/sutcliffe_park

Sutcliffe Park is a 16.7-hectare (41-acre) public park in Eltham in the Royal Borough of Greenwich in London. It is located west of Eltham town centre, east of Lee Green, north of Horn Park and south of Kidbrooke.

== Park features ==
A large part of the park is a local nature reserve and a Site of Borough Importance for Nature Conservation, Grade II. The site attracts wildlife such as dragonflies, damselflies, grey herons, little egrets, kingfishers, reed warblers and snipe. Sutcliffe Park is roughly square in shape and approximately 400m across. The River Quaggy meanders through the park, from the southeast corner to the northwest corner. The park contains an athletics track, outdoor gym, children's play park, a car park and bicycle locking facilities mostly on the south side, several small lakes on the northwest side, and a larger lake on the northeast side, all close by to the River Quaggy.

== History ==
The site was formerly known as Harrow Meadow. It was prone to flooding, and in the 1930s, when the surrounding area was being developed for housing, Woolwich Metropolitan Borough Council culverted the River Quaggy and laid out the site as playing fields. It was opened as a park in 1937, named after a former borough engineer. The area around the park still suffered from flooding, and in the 1990s the ground level was lowered in part of the park to hold flood waters, while the river was restored to meander at ground level. The scheme also including re-landscaping of the park to emphasise biodiversity and ecological benefits, with wetland areas and a lake. The park was re-opened in 2004, and the central area of the park, around the flood water collection area was declared a local nature reserve in 2006. It received a Green Flag award for 2012–13.

In September 2021, Sutcliffe Park hosted its first weekly parkrun.

== Access and public transport ==
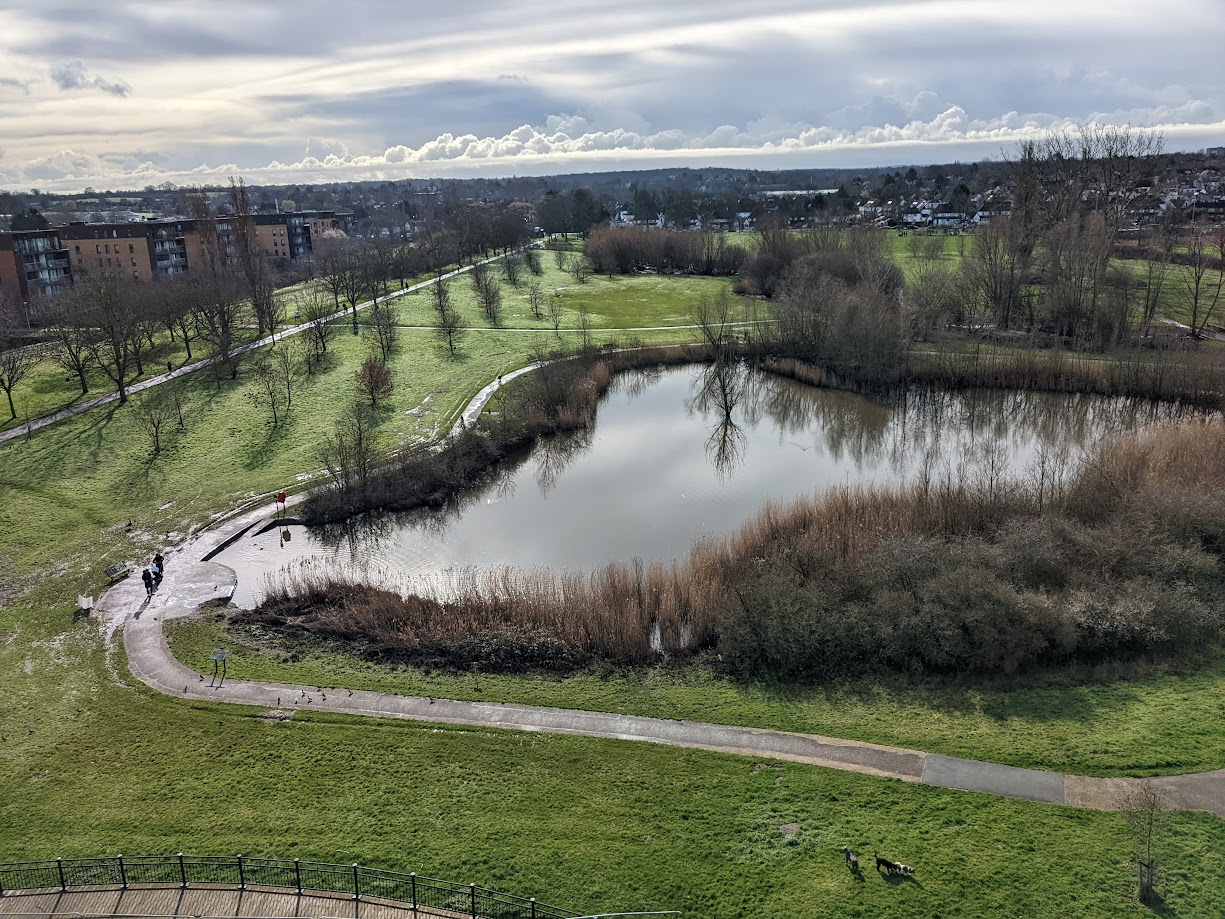
Sutcliffe Park viewed from Kidbrooke Village.

The park can be accessed from Tudway Road to the north, Eltham Road to the south, Kidbrooke Park Road to the west, and Dowding Drive to the east. Buses, 122, 178, 321, N21 serve the bus stops by the southern fence of the park on Eltham Road, buses 621, and B16 serve other near by bus stops. Kidbrooke railway station is the closest train station located less than a mile to the north of the park. Several major A roads are within half a mile of Sutcliffe Park, the South Circular, and the A20 to the south of the park, and the A2 to the northeast.
