= East Suffolk and Ipswich Hospital =

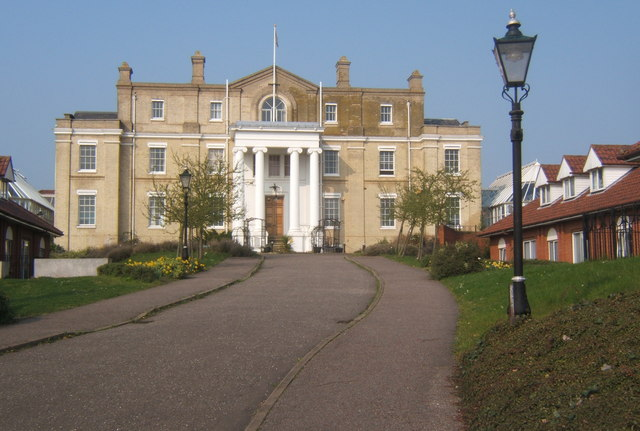
- East Suffolk and Ipswich Hospital

- Shown in Suffolk

Geography
- Location: Anglesea Road, Ipswich, Suffolk, England
- Coordinates: 52.0635°N 1.1504°E

Organisation
- Care system: NHS England
- Type: General

History
- Founded: 1835
- Closed: 1985

The East Suffolk and Ipswich Hospital was a National Health Service hospital in Anglesea Road, Ipswich, Suffolk, England. The former main building, which is now a private nursing home, is a Grade II listed building.

== History ==
The hospital was founded by public subscription by local residents in 1835. It was designed by John Whitling and opened as the East Suffolk and Ipswich Hospital and Dispensary in August 1836. A children's wing was added in 1875 and it was renamed the East Suffolk and Ipswich Hospital in 1902.

It joined the National Health Service in 1948 and it became the Ipswich Hospital, Anglesea Road Wing in 1955. After services transferred to Ipswich Hospital, Heath Road Wing, it closed in 1985. The main building re-opened as the Anglesea Heights Nursing Home in 1991.

== Notable staff ==
- Winifred Prentice (1910–2007) DBE, OBE, trained at the hospital from 1932 to 1935 before becoming a Ward Sister there. She would later become Matron Stracathro Hospital and President Royal College of Nursing from 1972 to 1976.
