= Mary Green (headteacher) =

English headmistress

"Molly" Green
- Green in 1965 in Kidbrooke School
- Born: 27 July 1913; Wellingborough
- Died: 19 April 2004 (aged 90)
- Education: Westfield College, University of London
- Occupation: Headteacher
- Known for: head of Kidbrooke School

Dame Mary Georgina Green DBE aka "Molly" Green (27 July 1913 – 19 April 2004) was an English headteacher who led Kidbrooke School, the first purpose-built comprehensive school in London.

== Life ==
Green was born in Wellingborough to Rose Margaret (born Gibbs) and Edwin George Green. Her father was a solicitor's clerk. Her schooling was usual but she was a linguist and studied modern languages at Westfield College, University of London.

One of her first teaching jobs was at William Hulme's Grammar School in Manchester where she took the classes of a teacher who was away in the war. From there she obtained her first leadership post as head of Colston's Girls' School in Bristol. She was there until 1954 when she took the job of leading Kidbrooke School, the first purpose-built comprehensive school in London. She was not an educationalist or an intellectual, she would think and then do. She relied on her own experience and common sense to decide the right path. She did keep the accent from her former school and she aimed to deliver grammar style education. She would drive to work and leave the car for the staff to park it, and then don her academic gown to lead whole school assemblies of 2,000 girls.

Green was later described as "the last of the great 'spinster headmistresses': one of the indomitable women who took command of Britain's wartime and postwar schools, spurred on by the revolutionary changes of the 1944 Education Act".

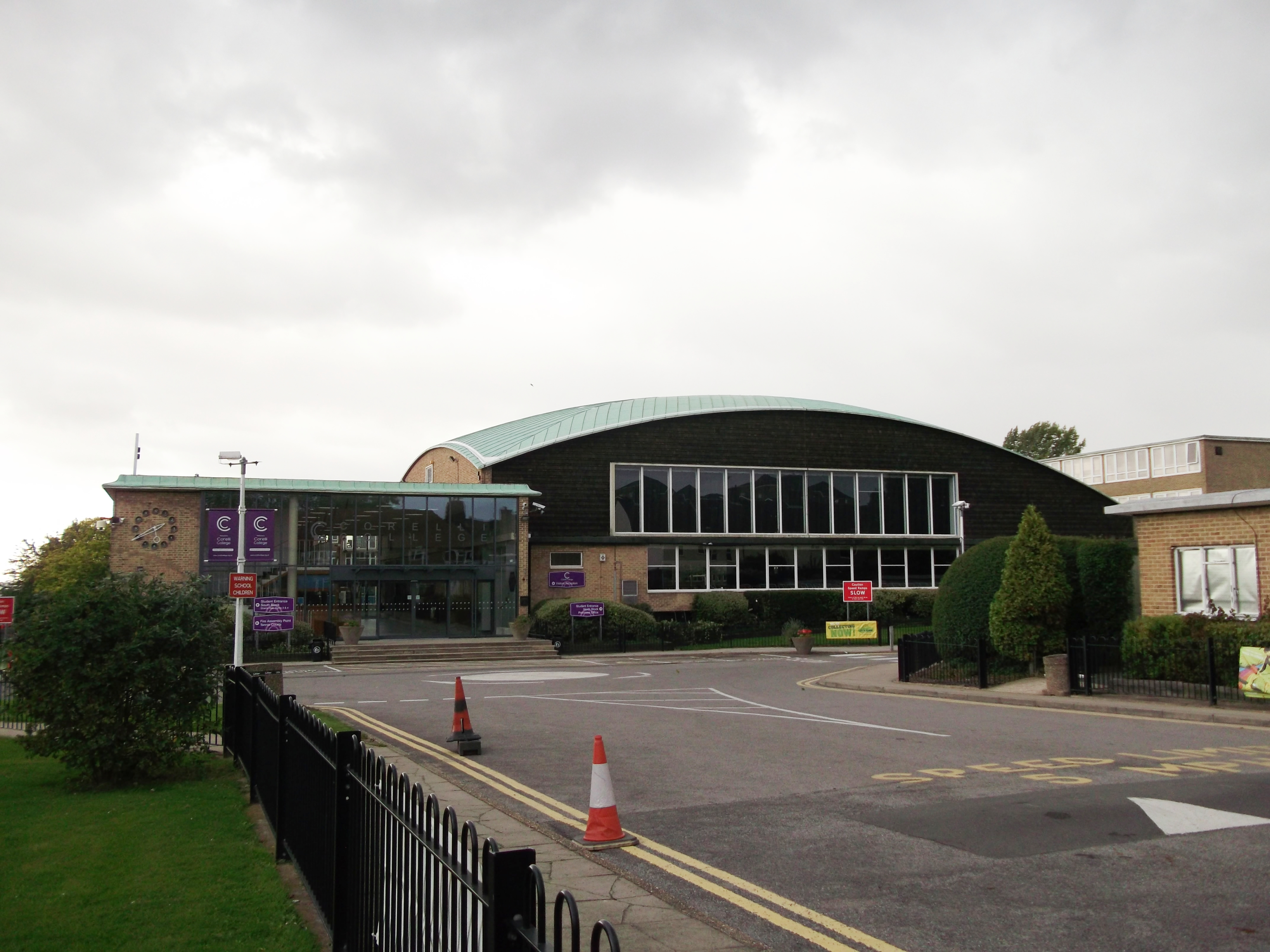
The curve-roofed hall of Kidbrooke School (then renamed Corelli College) in 2011

Her new school building was state of the art with parquetry floors, wooden tabletops, gyms, showers and a hall with a curved roof. The school field took land previously used as an Air Training Corps glider school; RAF Kidbrooke was its neighbour. The school uniform was symbolically in Royal Air Force colours, and the Countess Mountbatten of Burma opened the building in June 1955. The Minister for Education Florence Horsbrugh had taken an interest in its creation. She had denied the school an all-abilities (ie comprehensive) intake as a grammar school (Shooter's Hill) was allowed in the same catchment area where it could cream off some of the prospective pupils. One critic commented that the new school would be 'All equal and all stupid'.

Green was appointed to the Royal Commission on Trade Unions and Employers' Associations where she served for three years until it reported in 1968. In the 1968 New Year Honours she was made a Dame for "services to education" by Harold Wilson's government. The honour she said was for the school, she was just in the right place at the right time. Later she sat on government bodies looking at the pay of doctors, dentists and the government's 1974 Halsbury Report looking at the pay and conditions of nurses and midwives. She helped oversee the British press as a governor of the BBC and as a member of the Press Council. The school was opened in 1955 by Princess Margaret
