= William Henry Lang (soldier) =

British Military Officer and Recipient of the OBE

Lt. Col William Henry Lang OBE
- Born: 27 February 1878; Ottery St Mary, Devon, England
- Died: 27 December 1959 (aged 81); Aylesbury, Buckinghamshire, England
- Military career
- Allegiance: British Empire
- Branch: British Army
- Service years: 1914 - 1919
- Rank: Lieutenant Colonel
- Unit: Royal Flying Corps
- Commands: RAF Kidbrooke
- Conflicts: First World War
- Awards: Order of the British Empire; 1914–15 Star; British War Medal; Victory Medal

William Henry Lang, OBE (27 February 1878 – 27 December 1959) was a British Army officer during the First World War.

== Biography ==
Born in 1878 in Ottery St Mary, Lang was a Royal Air Force officer and recipient of the Order of the British Empire during the First World War.

Lang moved to Woolwich in London in 1898 to work at the Royal Arsenal. While at the Royal Arsenal, Lang engaged in experimental work in connection with artillery equipment, along with facilitated repairs and assisting in the creation of general handbooks. Upon the outbreak of war in 1914, Lang was granted a commission into the British Army as a lieutenant.

Upon the formation of the Royal Flying Corps, Lang changed branches. After being posted in Candas in France, Lang was promoted to major, and appointed as the park commander of the Greenwich Stores Depot in February 1917. Later that year, William Henry Lang was promoted to lieutenant colonel, and appointed as Depot Commander of RAF Kidbrooke. While in the Royal Flying Corps, William Henry Lang worked as a technical officer based on his specialised knowledge of wireless and photographic technologies along with technical knowledge of experimental guns and armaments.

In 1919, Lang resigned his commission in the Royal Air Force and received the rank of Officer of the Order of the British Empire in the New Year Honours List. During the Second World War, William Henry Lang was a sergeant in the Special Constabulary in Aylesbury.

Lang died aged 81, in Aylesbury, Buckinghamshire, England.
