= The Halley Academy =

High school in London, England

Leigh Academy Halley

Location
- Corelli Road; Shooters Hill Road; London, SE3 8EP; England; 51.46947°N 0.04353°E

Information
- Type: Academy
- Motto: Learning together, enjoying success.
- Established: 1954 (as Kidbrooke School); September 2011 (as Corelli College); March 2018 (as The Halley Academy)
- Local authority: Greenwich
- Trust: Leigh Academies Trust (LAT)
- Department for Education URN: 145315 Tables
- Ofsted: Reports
- Principal: Ben Russell
- Gender: Coeducational
- Age: 11 to 19
- Houses: Democracy; Equality; Independence; Solidarity; Trust; Sixth Form
- Colours: Yellow and Black
- Website: www.thehalleyacademy.org.uk

Leigh Academy Halley is a secondary school and sixth form with academy status located on Corelli Road and near the Kidbrooke area of the Royal Borough of Greenwich in southeast London. It originally opened in 1954 as Kidbrooke Comprehensive School for Girls and was one of Britain's first purpose-built comprehensive schools. It started admitting boys in 1982. It changed its name to Corelli College (based on the name of road where the school is located) in September 2011 when it became an Academy. It adopted The Halley Academy (after Edmond Halley) in March 2018, when it joined the Leigh Academies Trust and changed to its current name in September 2024.

== History ==
=== Kidbrooke School ===
The buildings were planned in 1949 and subsequently redesigned (by architect Charles Pike) in 1951 to meet spending cuts. It was built on the eastern part of the site of a former RAF glider school, situated on land adjacent to RAF Kidbrooke, by London County Council for "the children of the heroes of the second world war", with the school colours based on the blue and grey uniform of the Royal Air Force. Originally a girls school, it opened as Kidbrooke School in 1954 (and was officially opened on 15 June 1955 by Countess Mountbatten of Burma) as one of the first purpose-built comprehensive schools in Britain.

The founding Headteacher for 19 years, Dame Mary Green "was so proud of the fact that the local people called her pupils 'Smarties', thinking it was a reflection on their intelligence. In fact, the youngsters knew the nickname came from the different-coloured berets they had to wear outside school – a different colour for each of the eight houses. She was determined to ensure that all the pupils in her charge fulfilled their potential."

Kidbrooke started admitting boys after 1982 as the school began competing with other comprehensives in the area. (Note: Another source - the school's website - says the school became coeducational in 1980.)

==== Specialist arts college ====
From September 2005, the school was re-designated as a single specialist arts college specialising in media, drama and art.

=== Corelli College ===
Though the specialist colleges programme ended, and the school converted to academy status in September 2011 and was renamed Corelli College, it continued to maintain a specialism in the arts. The school adopted the Co-operative Academies governance model which is supported by the Schools Co-operative Society.

=== The Halley Academy ===
From the summer of 2016, Leigh Academies Trust (LAT) provided staff and support to Corelli College. On 16 December 2017, it was announced that Corelli College was adopting a new name and school branding including new school uniform, it became The Halley Academy in March 2018. This was done through the Fresh Start programme. In April 2019, staff at the school went on strike in protest at redundancies among support staff.

In September 2024, the school changed its name to Leigh Academy Halley.

== Premises ==
Designed by Slater, Uren and Pike, Kidbrooke School was LCC's first comprehensive school. The building was limited to three storeys and circulation space between classrooms was restricted to reduce cost. The central assembly hall had a standing capacity of 2,000 so the whole school could gather for morning prayers – a requirement of the Education Act 1944. It had a domed ceiling to optimise the acoustics. The domestic science section was seen as an important section in a 1954 girls school: the department had all of the model appliances the girls would encounter when they ran their own homes. There were fully furnished mock 'flats' where homemaking skills could be practised.

=== Refurbishment ===
In 2015, the school opened a new sports facility consisting of a sports hall, changing rooms, toilets, a dance studio, IT room, gym and a lift for wheelchair and buggy users. An arts complex was featured in the concept design of the sports facility, but was not built due to lack of budget.

In 2017, Corelli College painted all its interior walls white and replaced old windows with double glazing. The school also refurbished five science labs at a cost of £500,000.

== Media ==
=== Jamie's School Dinners ===
In 2005, Kidbrooke School was the focus of TV chef Jamie Oliver's campaign to improve school dinners in Britain as part of his TV series Jamie's School Dinners. Nora Sands, the head cook, had success with her book Nora's Dinners (published in 2006) and left the school on 24 May 2007.

=== Attack on student ===
On 24 January 1997 students from nearby Thomas Tallis School attacked one of the school's pupils, Carl "CJ" Rickard, aged 14. Six attackers were jailed for a total of 20 years, while Nathan Brown was convicted of murder, having killed Rickard with a 17-inch (43 cm) machete.

== Notable staff ==
Kidbrooke School

- Dame Mary (Molly) Green, first headteacher, from 1954 to 1973
- Molly Hattersley, educational policy maker

== Notable alumni ==
Kidbrooke School

- Michael Adebowale – Islamic terrorist convicted of the murder of Lee Rigby
- Jude Law – actor

Corelli College

- Fred Onyedinma – Millwall, Wycombe Wanderers and Luton Town footballer
