= Winifred Prentice =

Dame Winifred Eva Prentice DBE
- Born: 2 December 1910
- Died: 17 March 2007 (aged 96); Brechin, Scotland
- Occupation: Nursing administrator
- Organization: President of the Royal College of Nursing 1972–1976

Dame Winifred Eva Prentice DBE (2 December 1910 – 17 March 2007) was a British nursing administrator, best known as President of the Royal College of Nursing from 1972 to 1976.

== Early life ==
Winifred Eva Prentice was born on 2 December 1910 to Percy and Anna Prentice. Her father was a clothier/out-fitter and she was one of four children.

== Career ==
Prentice trained at the East Suffolk and Ipswich Hospital in 1932–1935, where she later became a Ward Sister. Upon registering in 1936 she joined the Royal College of Nursing (RCN). She completed part 1 of midwifery at Middlesex Hospital in 1939 and went on to do a short administrative course at the Norfolk and Norwich University Hospital. She worked as a Ward Sister in Lowestoft Hospital and then as an Administrative Sister in Colchester Hospital. She went on to do the Sister Tutor qualification at the Royal College of Nursing/King's College London and in 1944 was appointed as a Sister Tutor to run the teaching at West Norfolk and Lynn Hospital.

During the Second World War she took a job at Stracathro Hospital which was built in 1940 as an Emergency Medical Service hospital. Matron McHaughton established a new training school at the hospital but was seconded by the Scottish Office to help organise the Civil Nursing Reserve during the war. Prentice stepped into McHauton's role. In 1947, Prentice was made Principal Tutor at Stracathro Hospital, which had a growing nurse training school. In 1961, she was appointed Matron of Stracathro Hospital Brechin where she remained for twenty five years.

== Roles at the RCN ==
Alongside her role as Matron she was an active volunteer in her professional body. In 1952 she successfully stood for election to the UK RCN Council representing Scottish members she was successfully re-elected in the role until 1969. She was also Chair of the RCN Scottish Board and sat on the RCN Establishment and General Purposes Committees and the RCN Professional Association Committee. In 1969 she became RCN Vice President and was elected President from 1972 to 1976. Uniquely, her term of office was used as a trial period when she held the combined posts of President and Chair of Council 1972-1974.

Her term of office coincided with a period of nursing demonstrations. In 1974, Prentice led a delegation of forty-five RCN representatives to meet Barbara Castle. They presented Castle with 'The State of Nursing' a detailed report setting out concerns on standards of care, staffing, education and training, and pay and whilst they met, several thousand nurses marched through London. This led to the independent inquiry on nurses' pay and conditions, the Halsbury Report, which resulted in an average 33 per cent pay rise for nurses.

== Honours ==
Prentice was appointed Officer of the Order of the British Empire (OBE) in 1972 and a Dame Commander of the Order of the British Empire (DBE) in 1977.

== Death ==
Prentice died in Brechin on 17 March 2007, aged 96. A funeral service was held at St Andrews Episcopal Church, Brechin on 27 March 2007. She was erroneously listed as celebrating her 101st birthday in The Guardian, 2 December 2011.
