= Richard Reid =

British terrorist jailed in a US federal prison

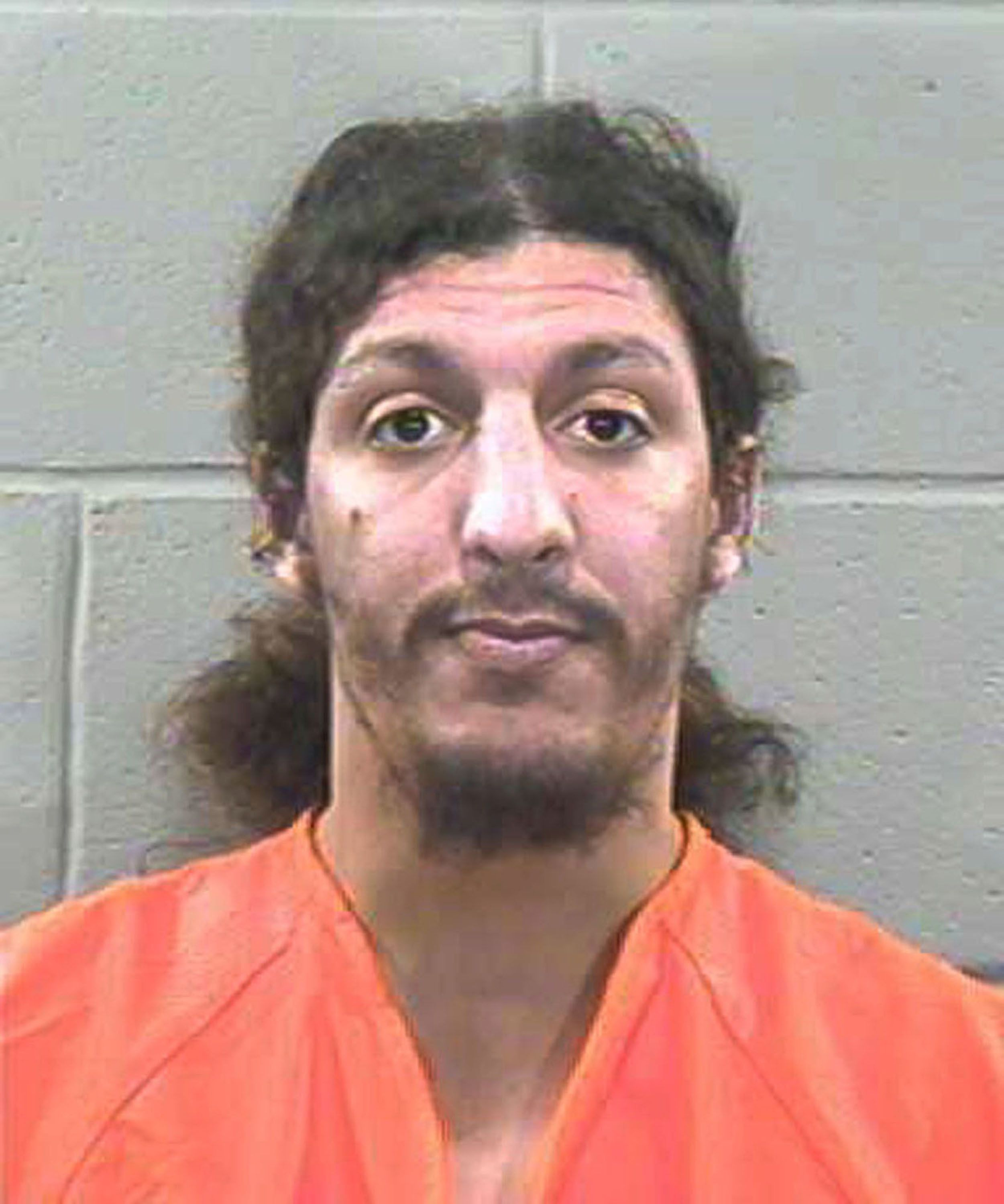
- Reid's mugshot at Plymouth County Correctional Facility, 2002
- Born: Richard Colvin Reid; 12 August 1973 (age 53); Bromley, London, England
- Other names: Abdel Rahim; Abdul Rof; the Shoe Bomber
- Status: Incarcerated at ADX Florence, Colorado, United States
- Convictions: Attempted use of a weapon of mass destruction; Attempted homicide; Placing or transporting an explosive or incendiary device on an aircraft or public mass transportation vehicle; Attempted murder; Interference with flight crew and attendants on an aircraft (2 counts); Attempted destruction of an aircraft or public transport vehicle; Use of a destructive device during and in relation to a crime of violence
- Criminal charge: Attempted wrecking of a public mass transportation vehicle (dismissed before plea)
- Penalty: 3 consecutive life sentences without the possibility of parole; plus 110 years

Richard Colvin Reid (born 12 August 1973), also known as the "Shoe Bomber", is a British Islamic terrorist who perpetrated the failed shoe bombing attempt against a transatlantic flight in 2001. Born to a career criminal father, Reid ended up in prison after years of committing petty crimes. While in prison, he was influenced by Muslim inmates he met there and converted to Islam. Later he became radicalised and went to Pakistan and Afghanistan, where he trained and became a member of al-Qaeda.

On 22 December 2001, Reid boarded American Airlines Flight 63 between Paris and Miami, wearing shoes packed with explosives, which he unsuccessfully tried to detonate. Passengers subdued him on the plane, which landed at Logan International Airport in Boston, the closest US airport. He was arrested, charged, and indicted. In 2002, Reid pleaded guilty in US federal court to eight federal criminal counts of terrorism, based on his attempt to destroy a commercial aircraft in flight. He was sentenced to three life terms plus 110 years in prison without parole and was transferred to ADX Florence, a super maximum security prison in Colorado.

== Background ==
Reid was born in Bromley, London, to Lesley Hughes, who was of native English descent, and Colvin Robin Reid, a man of mixed race whose father was a Jamaican immigrant. When Reid was born, his father, a career criminal, was in prison for stealing a car. Reid attended Thomas Tallis School in Kidbrooke, leaving at age 16 and becoming a graffiti writer who was in and out of detention. He began vandalizing by writing graffiti under the name "Enrol" as part of a gang, and ultimately accumulated more than 10 convictions for crimes against persons and property. He served sentences at Feltham Young Offenders Institution and at Maidstone Prison.

In 1992, while serving a three-year sentence for various street robberies, he was influenced by Muslims he met in prison and converted to Islam.

== Islamic radicalisation ==
Upon his release from prison in 1995, Reid joined the Brixton Mosque. He later began attending the Finsbury Park Mosque in North London, headed at that time by the anti-American cleric Abu Hamza al-Masri, who was described as "the heart of the extremist Islamic culture" in Britain. By 1998 Reid was voicing extremist views. At the Finsbury Park Mosque he fell under the sway of "terrorist talent spotters and handlers" including Djamel Beghal, one of the leaders of the foiled plan for a 2001 suicide bombing of the American Embassy in Paris.

Reid spent 1999 and 2000 in Pakistan and trained at a terrorist camp in Afghanistan, according to several informants. He may also have attended an anti-American religious training centre in Lahore as a follower of Mubarak Ali Gilani.

After his return to Britain, Reid attempted to obtain duplicate passports from British government consulates abroad. He lived and travelled in several places in Europe, communicating using an address in Peshawar, Pakistan, coincidentally where al-Qaeda was formed in the late 1980s.

== Preparation for bombing ==
Reid and Saajid Badat, another British man preparing as a terrorist, returned to Pakistan in November 2001, and reportedly travelled overland to Afghanistan. They were given "shoe bombs", casual footwear adapted to be covertly smuggled onto aircraft before being used to destroy them. Later forensic analysis of both bombs showed that they contained the same plastic explosive and that the respective lengths of detonator cord had come from the same batch: the cut mark on Badat's cord exactly matched that on Reid's. The pair returned separately to the United Kingdom in early December 2001. Reid went to Belgium for 10 days before catching a train to Paris on 16 December.

On 21 December 2001, Reid attempted to board a flight from Paris to Miami, Florida. His boarding was delayed because his dishevelled physical appearance aroused the suspicions of the airline passenger screeners. Once questioned by an ICTS agent, he was referred to the French National Police due to his seemingly evasive behaviour and lack of luggage. Because his British passport was genuine and his name was not found on any lists of suspected terrorists, the police did not X-ray him or use bomb-sniffing dogs. The extended questioning resulted in Reid missing his flight, so he stayed overnight at a hotel near the airport while American Airlines was allowed to re-issue a ticket. He returned to the airport the following day and boarded American Airlines Flight 63 from Paris to Miami, wearing shoes packed with plastic explosives in their hollowed-out bottoms.

== Bombing attempt on American Airlines Flight 63 ==
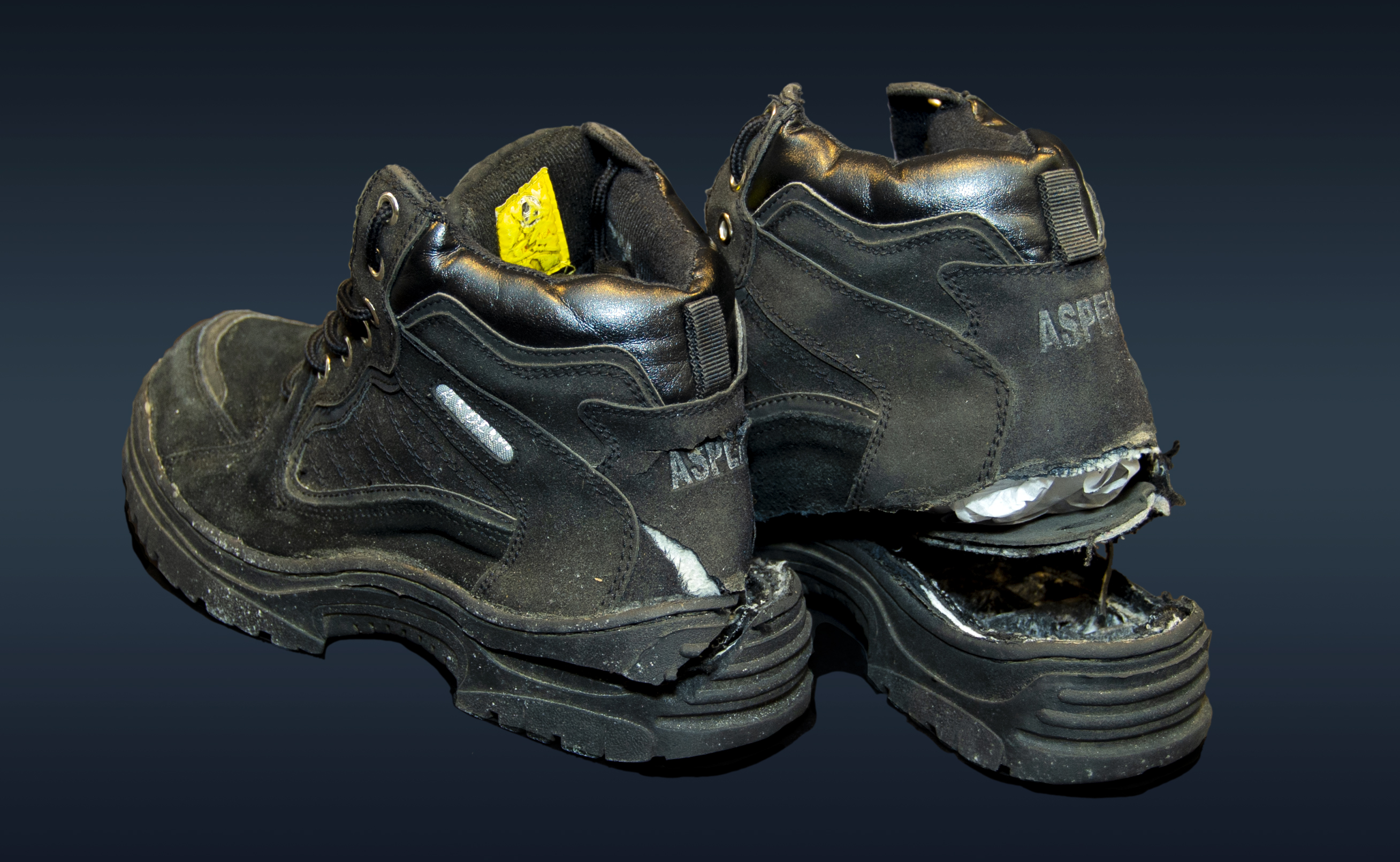
The shoes Reid tried to detonate during the flight.

On 22 December 2001, a passenger on Flight 63 from Paris to Miami complained of the smell of smoke in the cabin shortly after a meal service. One flight attendant, Hermis Moutardier, thinking she smelled a burnt match, walked along the aisles of the plane, trying to find the source. She found Reid, who was sitting alone near a window, attempting to light a match. Moutardier warned him that smoking was not allowed onboard the aircraft. Reid promised to stop.

A few minutes later, Moutardier found Reid leaned over in his seat. After she asked him what he was doing, Reid grabbed her, revealing one shoe in his lap, a fuse leading into the shoe, and a lit match. Several passengers worked together to subdue the 6-foot 2-inch (190 cm) tall, 215-pound (98 kg) Reid. They restrained him using plastic handcuffs, seatbelt extensions, leather waist belts and headphone cords. An off-duty doctor on board administered a tranquilizer to him, which he found in the emergency medical kit of the airliner. The flight was immediately diverted to Logan International Airport in Boston, Massachusetts, the closest airport in the United States.

The explosive apparently did not detonate due to the delay in the departure of Reid's flight. The rainy weather, along with Reid's foot perspiration, made the fuse too damp to ignite.

== Legal proceedings and sentencing ==
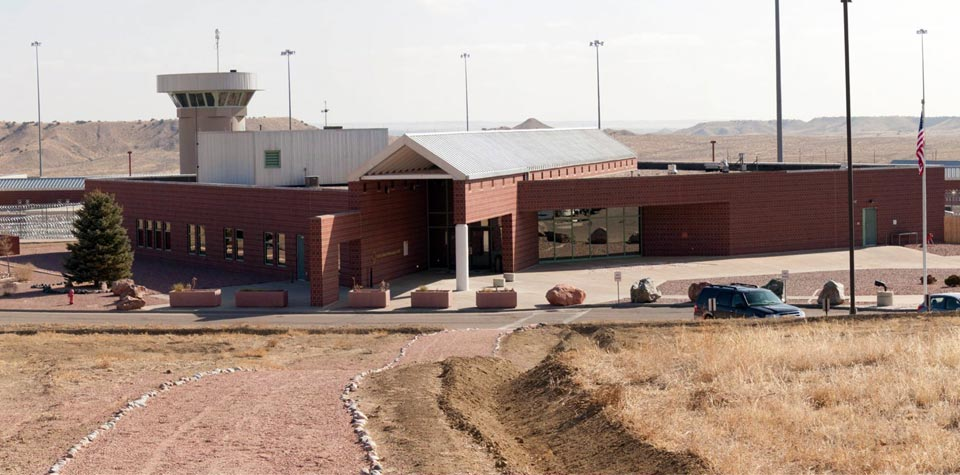
Reid is incarcerated at USP Florence ADMAX, pictured above

Reid was immediately arrested at Logan International Airport after the incident. Two days later, he was charged before a federal court in Boston with "interfering with the performance of duties of flight crew members by assault or intimidation", a crime which carries a penalty of up to 20 years in prison and a $250,000 fine. Additional charges were added when he was formally indicted by a grand jury. The judge ordered Reid held in jail without bail, pending trial due to the gravity of the crimes and the perceived high risk that he would try to flee. Officials at the time indicated that Reid's shoes contained 10 ounces (283 g) of explosive material characteristic of C-4, enough to blow a hole in the fuselage and cause the plane to crash.

During a preliminary hearing on 28 December, an FBI agent testified that forensic analysis had identified the chemicals as PETN, the primary explosive, and TATP (triacetone triperoxide), a chemical needed to detonate the bomb with a fuse and match. The prosecutor obtained a grand jury indictment and on 16 January 2002, Reid was charged with nine criminal counts related to terrorism, namely:

- Attempted use of a weapon of mass destruction
- Attempted homicide
- Placing or transporting an explosive or incendiary device on an aircraft or public mass transportation vehicle,
- Attempted murder
- Two counts of interference with flight crew members and attendants on an aircraft
- Attempted destruction of an aircraft or public mass transportation vehicle
- Using a destructive device during and in relation to a crime of violence
- Attempted destruction of an aircraft
- Attempted wrecking of a mass transportation vehicle

The ninth charge, attempted wrecking of a mass transportation vehicle, was dismissed on 11 June 2002, because the Congressional definition of "vehicle" did not include aircraft.

Reid pleaded guilty to the remaining eight counts on 4 October 2002. On 31 January 2003, he was sentenced by Judge William Young to the maximum of three consecutive life sentences and 110 years with no possibility of parole. Reid was also fined the maximum of $250,000 on each count, a total of $2 million.

During the sentencing hearing, Reid said he was an enemy of the United States and in league with al-Qaeda. When Reid said he was a soldier of God under the command of Osama bin Laden, Young responded:

You are not an enemy combatant, you are a terrorist ... You are not a soldier in any army, you are a terrorist. To call you a soldier gives you far too much stature. [points to U.S. flag] You see that flag, Mr. Reid? That is the flag of the United States of America. That flag will be here long after you are forgotten.

Reid reportedly demonstrated a lack of remorse and a combative nature during the hearing, and said that "the flag will come down on the day of judgment". He is serving his sentence at United States Penitentiary, Florence ADX, in Colorado, a supermax facility that holds the most dangerous prisoners in the federal system.

== Conspirators ==
Although Reid had insisted that he had acted alone and had built the bombs himself, forensic evidence included material from another person. In 2005, a British man, Saajid Badat from Gloucester, admitted that he had conspired with Richard Reid and a Tunisian man (Nizar Trabelsi, who is in prison in Belgium), in a plot to blow up two airliners bound for the United States, using their shoe bombs. Badat has said that he had been instructed to board a flight from Amsterdam to the United States. Badat never boarded and withdrew from his part of the conspiracy. Badat did not warn criminal or aviation authorities about Reid.

Badat confessed immediately after being arrested by police. The detonator cord in Badat's bomb was found to be an exact match for the cord on Reid's bomb, and their explosive chemicals were essentially identical. He had received the bomb-making materials from someone in Afghanistan. Badat was sentenced to 13 years in prison; he has since been released.

== Changes in airline security procedures ==
As a result of these events, some airlines encouraged passengers departing from an airport in the United States to pass through airport security in socks or bare feet while their shoes are scanned for bombs. From 2006 to 2025, the TSA required all passengers to remove their shoes for screening. Scanners do not find PETN in shoes or strapped to a person. A chemical test is needed. However, even if the X-ray scanners cannot detect all explosives, it is an effective way to see if the shoe has been altered to hold a bomb.

In 2011, the rules were relaxed to allow children 12 and younger and adults 75 and older to keep their shoes on during security screenings. The initial 2006 rule was repealed on July 7, 2025 when the TSA suspended the requirement of passengers removing their shoes for screening. The TSA announced the repeal of the rule the following day on July 8 and that "[t]he new policy will increase hospitality for travelers and streamline the TSA security checkpoint process, leading to lower wait times" and that "[o]ther aspects of TSA’s layered security approach will still apply during the TSA checkpoint process. For example, passengers subject must still clear identity verification, Secure Flight vetting, and other processes."

== Alleged role in 9/11 ==
Captured al-Qaeda terrorist conspirator Zacarias Moussaoui stated at his sentencing hearing in 2006 that Reid was a co-conspirator in the September 11 attacks on the United States, and that Moussaoui and Reid had intended to hijack a fifth aircraft and crash it into the White House in Washington, D.C. as part of the attacks that took place that day. Department of Justice investigators and the federal prosecutors were skeptical of Moussaoui's claim that Reid was involved in the plot.

== Prison restrictions ==
Reid filed a lawsuit challenging the restrictions placed on him in prison which controlled his communications with lawyers and other non-prisoners, limited his access to Muslim clerics, and prevented him from joining in group prayer at the prison. In 2009, Reid went on a hunger strike and was force-fed and hydrated for several weeks. It was unknown whether Reid's hunger strike was related to his lawsuit. The Department of Justice, after consulting with its counter-terrorism section, the prosecuting US attorney's office, and the Federal Bureau of Investigation, allowed Reid's prison restrictions to expire in 2009, rather than renewing them, making his lawsuit moot.

== See also ==
- 7 July 2005 London bombings
- Islamic terrorism
- List of unsuccessful terrorist plots in the United States post-9/11
- Ramzi Yousef
- Umar Farouk Abdulmutallab (popularly known as the "Underwear Bomber")
- United Airlines Flight 663
- Zacarias Moussaoui
