= Joint Services School for Linguists =

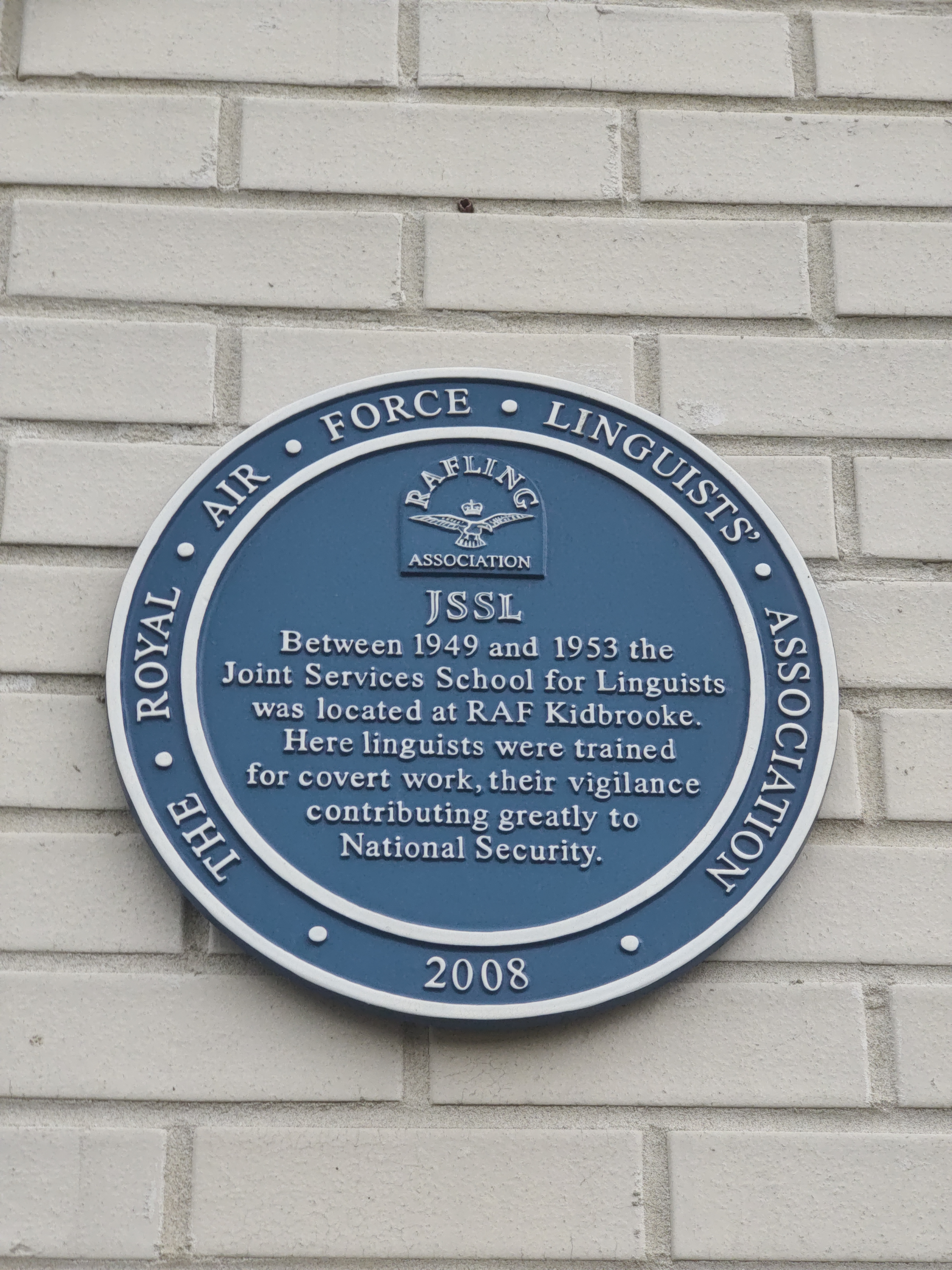
- Plaque at RAF Kidbrooke
- Type: Language training
- Active: 1949–c.1965
- Campus: RAF Kidbrooke (1949–1953) Bodmin / Coulsdon (1953–1956) RNAS Crail (1956–1960) RAF Tangmere (1960–c.1965)

The Joint Services School for Linguists (JSSL) was founded in 1949 by the British armed services to provide language training, principally in Russian, and largely to selected conscripts undergoing National Service.

== History ==
The school was established at RAF Kidbrooke in southeast London in 1949. The founding of the school was prompted by the need to provide greater numbers of interpreters, intelligence and signals intelligence officers due to the Cold War, and, later, the Korean War.

Additional sites, at Walker Lines, Bodmin, Cornwall, and at Coulsdon Common Camp in Coulsdon, near Croydon, opened in 1951 and 1952 respectively.

The Kidbrooke site closed in 1953, Coulsdon closed in 1954, and Bodmin closed in 1956. The school was then based at a single site at RNAS Crail in Scotland from easter 1956. It then moved, in 1960, to RAF Tangmere near Chichester in Sussex, where Mandarin, Polish and Czech in addition to Russian were taught.

The school was superseded by the work of the language wings at Wilton Park in Beaconsfield in the mid-1960s. The wings later combined to form the Defence School of Languages in 1985. The school remained at Beaconsfield until it moved to Shrivenham in April 2014.

== Training system ==
Russian tutors tended to be a mixture of White Russian émigrés and carefully vetted Soviet defectors. Among them were some odd and colourful figures, including an aged, wooden-legged "colonel of cavalry" who claimed to have lost his leg while fighting against the Reds in the Russian Civil war. Another, a mysterious 'Countess', always dressed from head to toe in black, "in permanent mourning' for the tsar and his family". One set of statistics from Bodmin listed the teaching staff as comprising:

Status	Origin	Number
Military	British	8
Civilian	British	8
Civilian	Russian/Soviet	22
Civilian	Polish	15
Civilian	Latvian	6
Civilian	Ukrainian	2
Civilian	Other	4

Probably the most important member of the teaching staff was Professor (later Dame) Elizabeth Hill, who was director of the JSSL through its period of existence.

One major teaching tool was the Anna H Semeonoff Grammar textbook, informally known as Semyonova. Other teaching materials included comprehensive vocabulary lists, a reading primer called Ordinary People, and a textbook by Pears and Wissotsky's titled Passages for Translation. Literature published in Russian, such as Crime And Punishment, was also used.

== Alumni and legacy ==
Aside from their military contribution, many of the estimated 6,000 trainees continued to use their skills in their subsequent civilian life in translation, business, education and cultural life. Notable alumni of the school include former Governor of the Bank of England Eddie George, playwright and novelist Michael Frayn, actor and writer Alan Bennett, dramatist Dennis Potter, and former director of the Royal National Theatre Sir Peter Hall. The Soviet spy Geoffrey Prime was also a graduate of JSSL at Crail. The industrialist John Harvey-Jones graduated from an early version of the JSSL course in 1945, during the period it was run from Cambridge.

Another alumnus, D. M. Thomas, has argued that as well as the school's stated aim of producing linguists for a military purpose, it also 'created a generation of young and influential Britons who had generous, respectful and affectionate feelings for Russia — the eternal Russia of Tolstoy, Pushkin and Pasternak'.

Several alumni went on to successful careers in academia. These include John Fennell (Professor of Russian, University of Oxford), Tony Stokes (Professor of Russian, University of Cambridge), Gerry Smith (Professor of Russian, University of Oxford). Ronald Hingley, who ran the London branch of the JSSL, went on to a successful career at the University of Oxford and became an authority on Anton Chekhov. Outside the field of Russian studies, Myles Burnyeat, professor of ancient philosophy at Cambridge, was a renowned scholar of Plato.

For various reasons, the JSSL attracted significant interest from Soviet intelligence. There is, however, no evidence that the School as an organisation or any of its students was ever successfully penetrated by Soviet intelligence.

== See also ==
- British military history
- Defense Language Institute
- Intelligence (information gathering)
