= Saajid Badat =

British terrorist

- Born: 28 March 1979 (age 47); Gloucester, England
- Known for: shoe bomb

Saajid Muhammad Badat (born 28 March 1979) is a British born, from Indian Gujarati descent, terrorist who was sentenced to a 13-year prison term for planning to blow up an aircraft with a bomb hidden in his shoe.

Badat did not go through with the plot. His co-conspirator Richard Reid attempted unsuccessfully to set off his bomb and is now serving a life sentence without parole in the United States.

== Radicalisation ==
Badat began his education at The Crypt School in Gloucester. After this, Badat began studying at an Islamic college in Lancashire; from 1999 he attended a madrassa in Pakistan. Investigators believe he became radicalised there under the influence of Al-Qaeda sympathisers. It is believed he trained in Pakistan and possibly in neighbouring Afghanistan. There he reportedly met Richard Reid, another British citizen, and the Al-Qaeda military commander Mohammed Atef. Badat returned to the UK in early 2001, but remained in email contact via "Bobu", his handler (alleged to be Tunisian footballer Nizar Trabelsi).

After his return, Badat, like Reid, obtained duplicate passports from British consulates (court documents claim Badat was in the British embassy in Brussels doing so on 12 September 2001, having watched the attacks of the previous day on television). Both Reid and Badat returned to Pakistan in November 2001, and reportedly travelled overland to Afghanistan. They both were given "shoe bombs", casual footwear adapted to be covertly smuggled onto aircraft before being used to destroy them. Later forensic analysis of the bombs showed that they both contained the same plastic explosive and that the respective lengths of detonator cord had come from the same batch (the cut mark on Badat's cord matches exactly that on Reid's). The pair returned separately to the UK in early December 2001.

On their return, both maintained contact with their handler(s) in Pakistan, using a system of telephone cards and email accounts. Soon after this, Badat emailed his handler, indicating he was unsure if he would proceed with the scheme. But, he booked a flight from Manchester to Amsterdam, in preparation for taking a US-bound flight from there. Reid did likewise, booking a flight to Paris and thence to Miami. On 22 December 2001 Reid boarded his flight. Badat did not, having emailed his handler, "You will have to tell Van Damme that he could be on his own". He later testified that he was talked out of the bombing by his father, who told him, on his return from Afghanistan, that "I've heard about sleepers. If I find out you are one of those sleepers I will kill you."

== Aftermath ==
Following the failure of Reid's mission and his arrest and conviction, Badat remained silent and returned to his Islamic studies in Blackburn. He appears to have cut ties with his handler in Pakistan, but kept the shoe bomb components at his home on St. James Street in Gloucester (the detonator under his bed, the explosive in a hallway cupboard). Acting on secret intelligence, police searched the home in November 2003. They found the concealed bomb parts (they had evacuated more than 100 families from houses in the surrounding area) and arrested Saajid Badat. After the families were allowed to return, his father Muhammad Badat reportedly spent several days visiting each home in the neighbourhood to apologise for his son.

== Sentencing and imprisonment ==
On 28 February 2005 at the Old Bailey in London, Badat pleaded guilty to involvement in a conspiracy to destroy a US-bound aircraft. On 22 April Badat was sentenced to 13 years' imprisonment. Delivering the sentence the judge, Mr Justice Fulford, said Badat's withdrawal from the plot justified a more lenient sentence, saying, "Turning away from crime in circumstances such as these constitutes a powerful mitigating factor". Had Badat not withdrawn, the judge said, he would have received a life sentence.

During his imprisonment, Badat assisted British and US authorities with information on other alleged terrorists. Some of this information was used in the US prosecution of Adis Medunjanin, a suspect in a 2009 plot to attack the New York City Subway. Because of this co-operation, Badat's sentence was cut from 13 years to 11, and an order put in place banning reporting of this deal to police and the media due to concern for Badats' safety until he was due to give evidence in public. In 2012 the British government revealed that Badat had been released from prison in March 2010. Theresa May was questioned by Labour MP Keith Vaz about the deal which included the use of taxpayer money to rehouse Badat and provide an office space with phone and internet service. May defended the agreement citing that "Crown Protection Services have said that they considered very carefully the merits of entering into this agreement with a convicted terrorist, that they believed the administration of justice would actually benefit from the agreement they entered into" and that "co-operation is obviously a long-standing feature of our criminal justice system".

== Shoe bomb testimony ==
Saajid Badat also gave evidence (via video-link from his secret hiding place in the UK) in March 2014 at the trial in New York of Sulaiman Abu Ghaith (Osama bin Laden's son-in-law), during which he testified that instructions were given to him during his time in Afghanistan (2001) to give shoe bombs to a group of four to five Malaysian terrorists, one of them the pilot. Badat gave them one of his own shoe bombs. Badat and the Malaysian terrorists discussed the possibility that the cockpit door in the airliner might be locked: "So I said: 'How about I give you one of my bombs to open the cockpit door?'"

One possible target of the Malaysian terrorist plot (masterminded by Khalid Sheikh Mohammed) would be the Petronas Towers in Kuala Lumpur, the world's tallest buildings from 1998 until 2004. These potential Malaysian Islamists' connections with Badat and Al-Qaeda were uncovered just a few days after the MH370 disappearance. The link was discussed by British media in 2014.
