= Kidbrooke Village =

Residential development in Kidbrooke, London, England

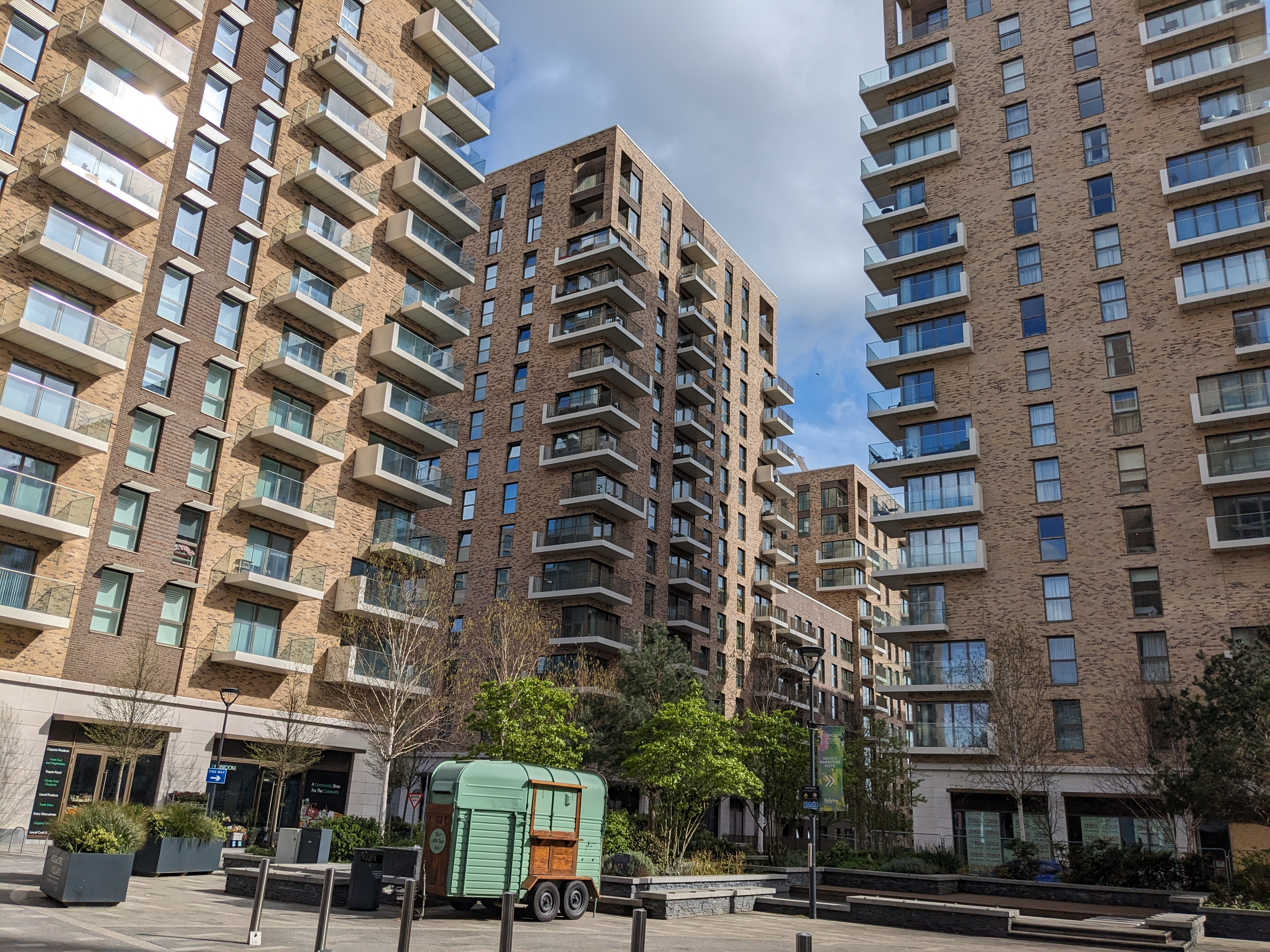
- Kidbrooke Village by the Kidbrooke railway station
- Interactive map of Kidbrooke Village

General information
- Location: Kidbrooke, Greenwich, London, England
- Coordinates: 51.460°N 0.027°E
- Status: Under development

Construction
- Constructed: 2010s - Present

Kidbrooke Village is a residential development located in the Kidbrooke area of the Royal Borough of Greenwich, in London, England. It is part of a larger regeneration project aimed at transforming the former Ferrier Estate into a new, mixed-use community. The development is a collaborative effort involving the local government, housing developers, and community stakeholders.

== History ==
The area now known as Kidbrooke Village was originally home to the Ferrier Estate, a large post-war public housing estate built in the 1960s and 1970s. By the early 21st century, the estate had fallen into disrepair and was deemed unsuitable for modern living standards, leading to plans for its redevelopment.

=== Development ===
The redevelopment of Kidbrooke Village began in the early 2010s, with the aim of replacing the aging Ferrier Estate with a new, vibrant community. The project was designed to include a mix of residential units, commercial spaces, and public amenities. Key features of the development include high-quality architecture, green spaces, and a focus on sustainability.

== Service Charge Controversy ==
As of 2026, there is significant concern among leaseholders regarding rising service charges across the Village. Annual increases have been averaging approximately 10 percent year on year. The current estimated service charge levels are:

- Around £5,500 per year for a typical two bedroom flat
- Around £6,500 per year for a typical three bedroom flat

These figures have led to growing frustration within the community, with many residents questioning the sustainability of continued increases at this rate and seeking greater transparency over cost allocation and estate management.

== Community and Amenities ==
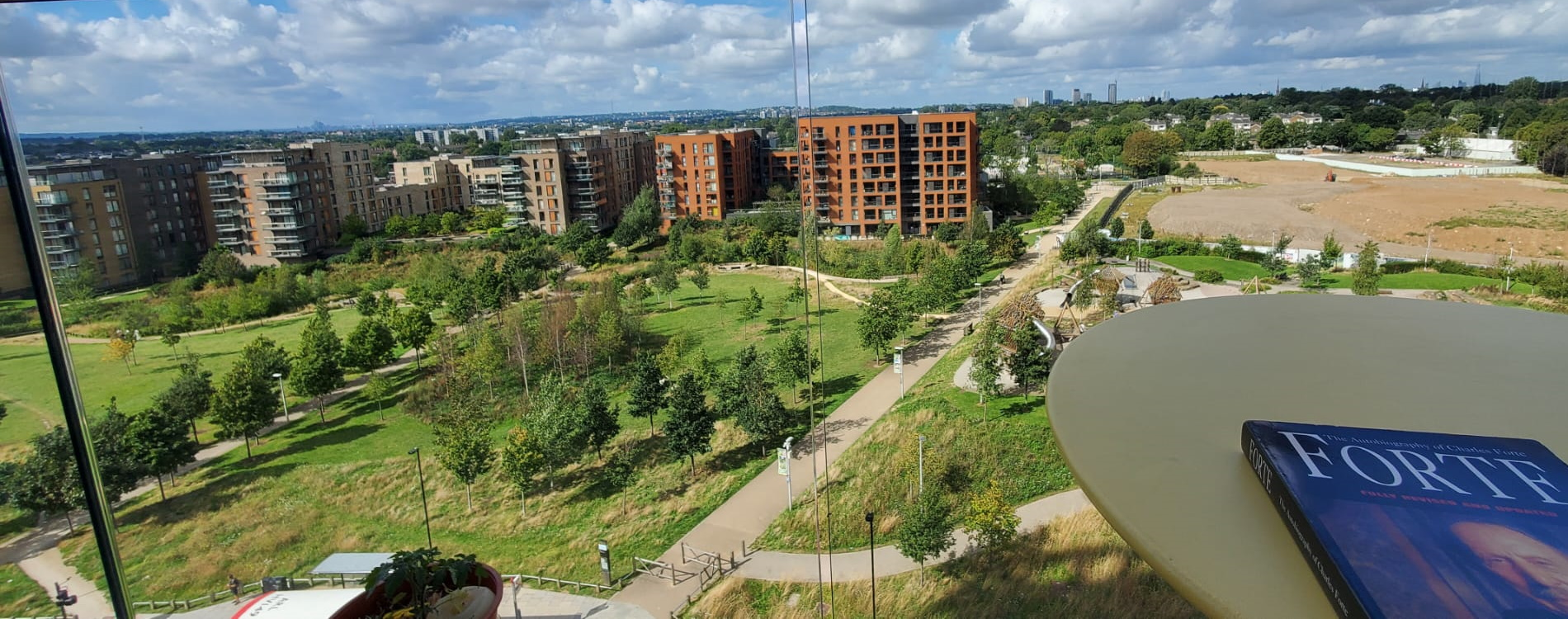
Cator Park Playground in Kidbrook Village, with The Shard at top right of the background.

Kidbrooke Village offers a variety of amenities to its residents, including shops, cafes, schools, and healthcare facilities. There is also a street food market next to the rail station. The development also features extensive landscaped areas, playgrounds, and sports facilities, promoting a healthy and active lifestyle. In 2020, the playground of Cator Park won the David Attenborough award for enhancing biodiversity.

The area is also home to Honour and Glory Boxing Club, an amateur boxing club operating from 122 Broad Walk since 2020, which provides sessions for children from age 5 and trains amateur and professional boxers.

== Transportation ==
The village is well-connected to public transport, with Kidbrooke railway station providing regular services to Central London and other destinations. From the train station to the City of London takes 20 minutes. Additionally, several bus routes serve the area, facilitating easy access to surrounding neighborhoods including North Greenwich, Blackheath, Cutty Sark.

== Environmental Impact ==
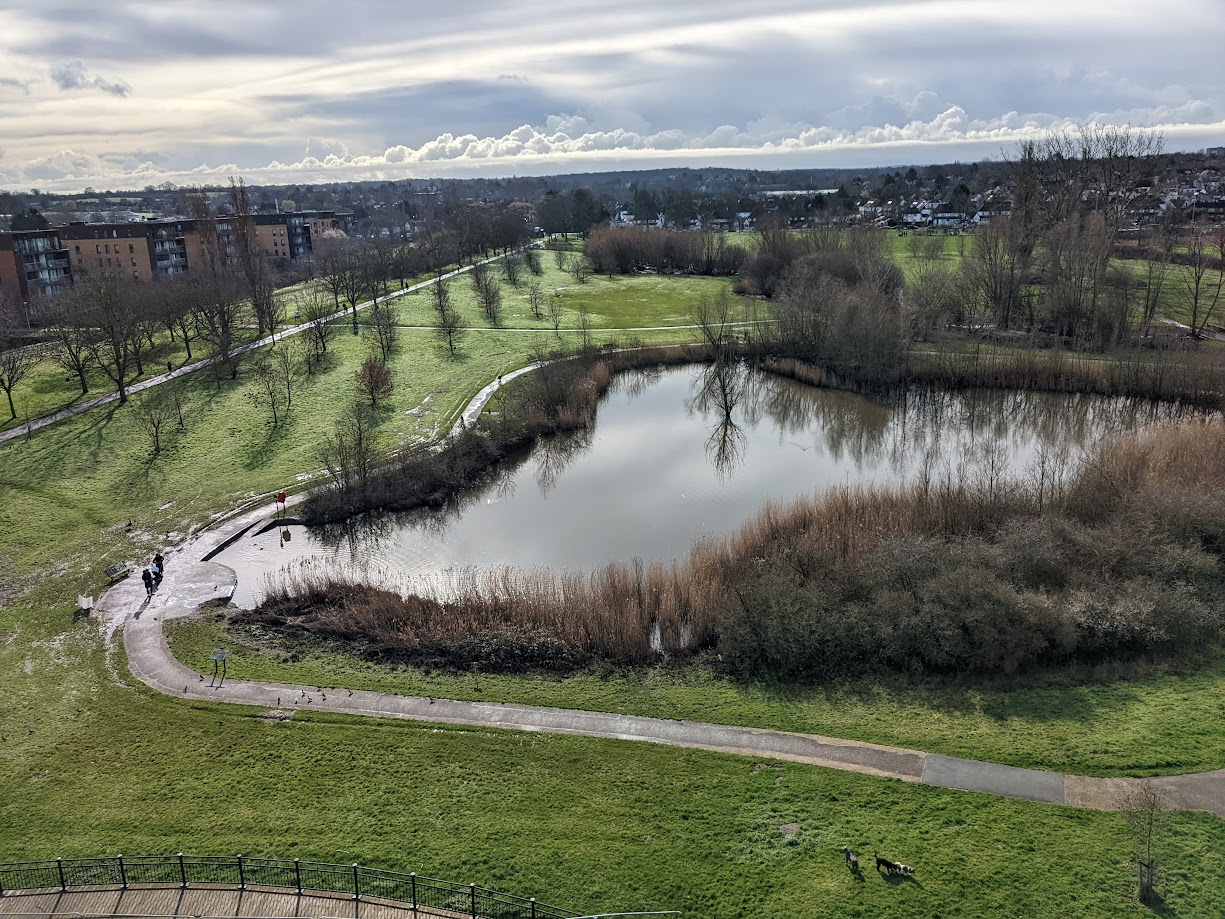
Sutcliffe Park viewed from Kidbrooke Village.

Sustainability has been a key consideration in the development of Kidbrooke Village. Efforts have been made to include energy-efficient building designs, the use of renewable energy sources, and the preservation of natural habitats. The local nature reserve in the area includes a 16.7-hectare Sutcliffe Park etc. The development also features rainwater harvesting systems and electric vehicle charging points.

== See also ==
- Ferrier Estate
- Sutcliffe Park
- River Quaggy

== Sources ==
- Lees, L.; Warwick, E. (2022). Defensible Space on the Move: Mobilisation in English Housing Policy and Practice. RGS-IBG Book Series. Wiley. ISBN 978-1-119-50040-7.
