= RAF Kidbrooke =

Former RAF airbase in London

RAF Kidbrooke
- Kidbrooke, London in England

Site information
- Type: Royal Air Force station
- Owner: Ministry of Defence
- Operator: Royal Air Force

Location
- Shown within Greater London
- Coordinates: 51.464°N 0.027°E

Site history
- Built: 1917
- In use: 1917-1965

Airfield information
- Elevation: 31 metres (102 ft) AMSL
Runways
Direction	Length and surface
00/00	Grass

Royal Air Force Kidbrooke or more simply RAF Kidbrooke is a former Royal Air Force station, situated in Kidbrooke in south-east London, in the Royal Borough of Greenwich. The site was operational from 1917 to 1965 and was mainly used as a stores, maintenance and training facility.

== History ==
Established in 1917, the facility was initially a Royal Flying Corps storage depot, situated on both sides of the railway line close to Kidbrooke railway station. In 1917, several large storage warehouses and offices were constructed, that stretched for 1,000 yards (910 m) alongside both sides of the line, served by sidings and an extensive 2 ft (610 mm) gauge network. (Note: A steam engine, Kidbrooke, used on the narrow gauge system at this time is preserved on the Yaxham Light Railway in Norfolk. Another engine, P-class No.178, is preserved on the Bluebell Railway in Sussex.) In December of 1917, RFC Kidbrooke was placed under the command of Lt. Col. William Henry Lang.

The RFC became the RAF on 1 April 1918. Kidbrooke became No 1 Stores Depot which was predominantly staffed by members of the Women's Royal Air Force. It became No 1 Equipment Depot in February 1937 and No 1 Maintenance Unit in April 1938. It was disbanded as a stores in February 1947, though its facilities remained in use but managed from elsewhere.

During the Second World War, the base was expanded to include a barrage balloon depot, providing balloons to defend London against low-flying enemy aircraft. This was also the base for the No 1 Balloon Centre and 901 Squadron (a barrage balloon squadron of the Auxiliary Air Force) and No 2 Installation Unit, responsible for constructing and repairing Chain Home radar station masts. On adjacent land to the north of the railway line, No. 141 Gliding School RAF for the Air Training Corps operated from October 1942 to December 1945, after which it transferred to RAF Gravesend and then RAF Detling in north Kent. After the war, the radar installation Unit transferred to RAF West Drayton in Middlesex.

Between 1949 and 1953, the Joint Services School for Linguists taught servicemen and women with an aptitude for languages to speak Russian. In January 1954, the RAF Movements School was formed at RAF Kidbrooke, tasked to provide cargo movements and mobility training to personnel of all three Services and other Government departments. It had a staff of 47 and ran around 25 courses, ranging in length from under a week to a 17-week basic recruit course, delivered to over 1,900 personnel per annum. In January 1963, the School moved to RAF Kirton in Lindsey, Lincolnshire, but was disbanded the following December.

RAF Kidbrooke was also the home of No 4 MT Squadron. The squadron, manned by service and civilian personnel and equipped with a variety of vehicles including heavy trucks and Queen Mary low loaders, was responsible for the movement of equipment mainly in the south of England. It also provided vehicles such as the Scammel Scarab in the London Docks. All RAF personnel were posted away in 1967 when the squadron civilianised. When RAF Kidbrooke closed in around 1968/69, the civilian staff and vehicles were relocated to Woolwich Arsenal.

=== Wartime murder ===
During the Second World War, on 14 February 1944, Iris Miriam Deeley, a leading aircraftwoman with No 1 Balloon Centre was murdered near Well Hall railway station as she was returning to Kidbrooke. Her murderer, Ernest Kemp, was arrested a week later. He was tried and convicted at the Old Bailey, and, after being condemned to death, was executed at Wandsworth Prison on 6 June 1944.

== The site today ==
After the base's closure, much of the site was used for housing, with the Ferrier Estate (1968–2012) being constructed to the south of the railway lines. In the 1980s the Rochester Way Relief Road was built across the northern part of the site, alongside the railway line, carrying the A2 south of its earlier route. The Kidbrooke training facility was on the site today occupied by Thomas Tallis School, in which the RAF Linguists' Association unveiled a commemorative plaque in 2008 (re-dedicated in July 2014).

Part of the eastern side of the open land of the glider school site, which was north and east of the base itself, is now occupied by The Halley Academy (from 1954 to 2011, Kidbrooke School).
