= Nizar Trabelsi =

Tunisian footballer (born 1970)

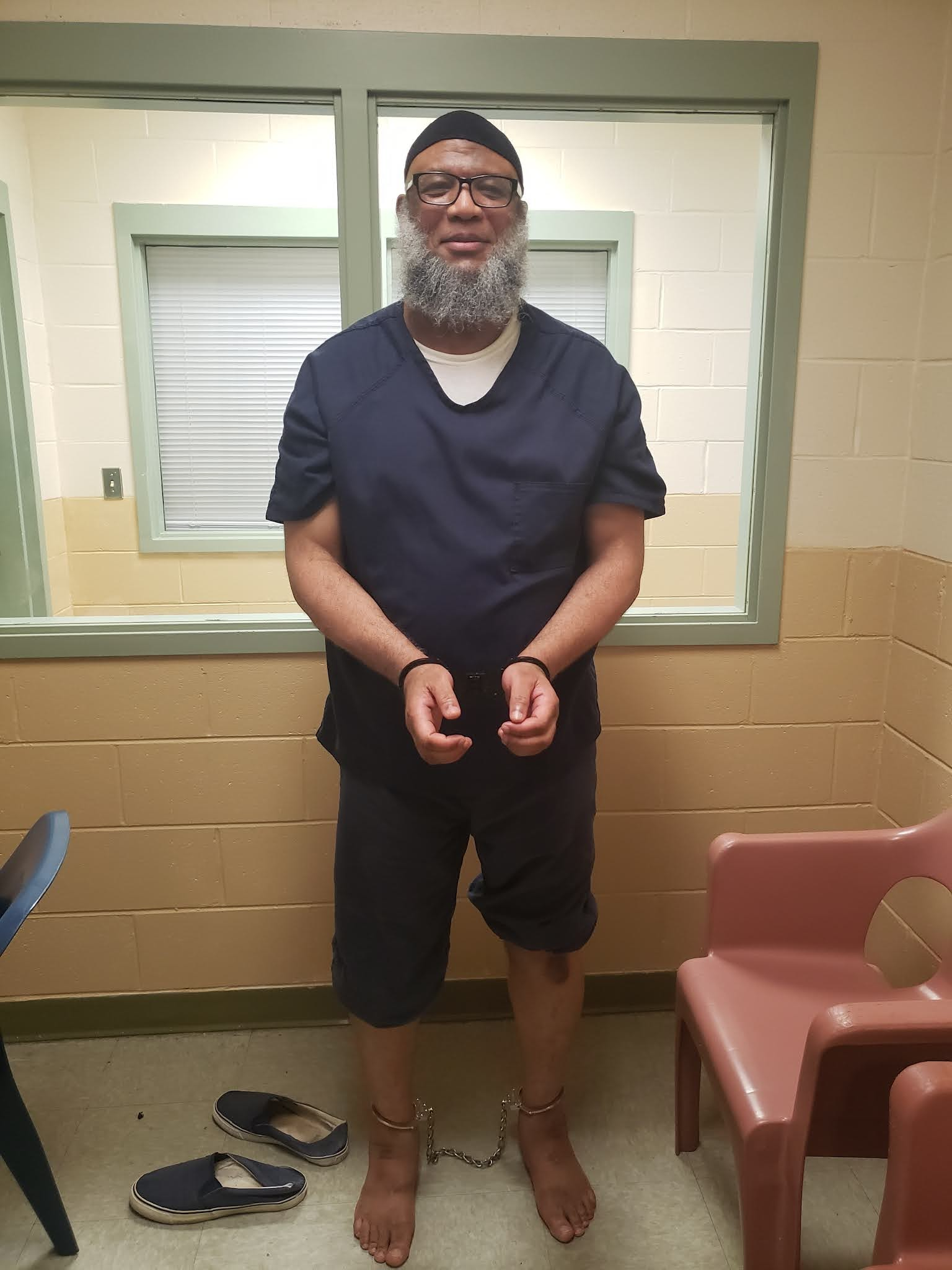
- Nizar Trabelsi in custody

Personal information
- Full name: Nizar ben Abdelaziz Trabelsi
- Date of birth: 2 July 1970 (age 56)
- Place of birth: Sfax, Tunisia
- Position: Attacking midfielder

Senior career*
Years	Team	Apps	(Gls)
1987–1989	CS Sfaxien		
1989–1990	Fortuna Düsseldorf	1	(1)
1989–1990	Fortuna Düsseldorf II		
1992	Borussia Wuppertaler		
1992	1. FC Wülfrath		
1993	SV 09/35 Wermelskirchen	1	(0)
1993–1994	VfR Neuss		
- * Club domestic league appearances and goals

Nizar ben Abdelaziz Trabelsi (born 2 July 1970) is a Tunisian former professional footballer. In 2003, a Belgian court convicted and sentenced Trabelsi to ten years' imprisonment for his association with Al-Qaeda, and for a variety of crimes, including attempting to destroy the military base Kleine Brogel Air Base. After serving his time he was sent to the United States to be prosecuted for terrorism and was cleared by a federal jury in July 2023. Trabelsi was imprisoned in the U.S until he was extradited back to Belgium in 2025 where he was released.

== Football career ==
Considered a talent of Tunisian football, Trabelsi started his career at his hometown club CS Sfaxien.

Trabelsi then moved to Germany to play for Fortuna Düsseldorf, however Fortuna quickly deemed him to be unsuitable for professional football. He then moved to Wuppertaler SV, before playing for amateur clubs 1. FC Wülfrath, SV 09/35 Wermelskirchen and VfR Neuss, as a midfielder. Shortly afterwards, he disappeared from football altogether.

== Association with Al-Qaeda ==
Trabelsi traveled to Afghanistan and met Osama bin Laden on several occasions. In 2001, Trabelsi was suspected of plotting to attack a US embassy in Paris, which was uncovered and stopped. He was said to be the designated suicide bomber, and was to wear a business suit to conceal the strapped bomb onto himself before walking into the embassy.

Trabelsi was arrested in an apartment, in Uccle near Brussels, Belgium on 13 September 2001. He was also implicated by Briton Saajid Badat, who alleged that both of them had conspired with Richard Reid supposedly to blow up two US-bound airliners using shoe bombs simultaneously.

=== Conviction ===
In 2003, Trabelsi was sentenced to a ten-year prison term in Belgium, for plotting to attack the Kleine Brogel Air Base. He was also found guilty of illegal weapons possession and being a member in a private militia. On 3 October 2013, he was extradited to the United States.

The United States had requested that Belgium extradite Trabelsi, given that American military personnel were present at the base. Trabelsi challenged that request in Belgium, contending that his extradition would violate the Extradition Treaty Between the United States of America and the Kingdom of Belgium of 1987. Belgium disagreed and extradited Trabelsi to the United States.

In September 2014, the European Court of Human Rights found that his deportation was performed in violation of Article 3 of the European Convention on Human Rights and ordered Belgium to pay 60,000 euros in damages to Trabelsi.

Trabelsi was extradited to the United States in October 2013, after he completed his sentence in Belgium. He was kept ten years in solitary confinement, awaiting trial. On 14 July 2023, he was found not guilty in an American federal court. Despite the outcome of this trial, Trabelsi remains to be held in jail, also in solitary confinement, in what he calls "a black hole". The cell measures 3.5 by 3.5 meters, the light is burning constantly, and he is only allowed to leave the cell for one hour per day. The European Court of Human Rights has on multiple occasions convicted the governments of Belgium for the circumstances Trabelsi has been living in since his deportation.

Despite being cleared by a U.S. federal jury in July 2023, Nizar Trabelsi did not receive financial compensation from the U.S. because the government immediately transferred him to immigration detention. Instead of releasing him, the U.S. held him until his eventual return to Belgium. In the U.S., financial compensation is not typically awarded to foreign nationals acquitted of criminal charges, especially when immigration issues are involved.

Trabelsi's lack of compensation is linked to several factors:

- Immigration status: Following his acquittal, the U.S. government did not treat Trabelsi as a "free man" but as a foreign national subject to immigration law. He was considered an "ineligible applicant for admission" and was placed in immigration detention, remaining there for more than two years.
- Failed criminal case, not civil violation: The acquittal by the federal jury meant the government failed to prove his guilt in the criminal case. However, this does not automatically lead to a finding that the government committed a civil violation that would require financial compensation.
- Unlawful detention lawsuit: After his acquittal, Trabelsi filed a lawsuit against the U.S. government with support from the American Civil Liberties Union (ACLU). However, this lawsuit focused on challenging the legality of his continued detention, citing violations of immigration law and the U.S.-Belgium extradition treaty, rather than seeking financial damages for his unjust imprisonment. The U.S. District Court for the Eastern District of Virginia later ruled it did not have jurisdiction over his immigration detention.

As a consequence of these rulings, national courts in Brussels have demanded for Trabelsi to be extradited back to Belgium, with a penalty for the federal government of Belgium of up to €200.000 if this demand is not met.

Despite being acquitted, Trabelsi remained in a US prison until 2025, when the American Civil Liberties Union (ACLU) challenges the legality of Trabelsi's detention, citing violations of the U.S.-Belgium Extradition Treaty, U.S. immigration law, and the U.S. Constitution. He returned to Belgium on August 8, 2025 and was freed on October 22, 2025 by the Belgian federal authorities after an unsuccessful bid by the government to extradite him to Tunisia, his country of origin, which was rejected on humanitarian grounds by the Council chamber of Brussels and the Council for Alien Law Litigation, an independent administrative court. His lawyer declared to the press on that day: "My client has no ill will towards the Belgian society and simply wants a chance to build his life again, and return to Tunisia one day, but not before ensuring that he won't be arrested and tortured by the Tunisian authorities."
