= Cator Park =

Park in Greenwich, England

- Interactive map of Cator Park
- Location: Kidbrooke Park Road, Kidbrooke, Greenwich, SE3 9FZ
- Coordinates: 51.461°N 0.026°E
- Area: 8 hectares (20 acres)

Cator Park is a park in Kidbrooke, in the Royal Borough of Greenwich. It has won awards for placemaking, biodiversity, and landscape.

It was resigned by HTA Design in collaboration with the London Wildlife Trust and opened to the public in 2019. The park is made up of multiple biophilic spaces including lakes, wetlands and ponds. It is a protected space for wetland birds. The park also includes sports facilities and a 3000m³ play space at the park most elevated point.
