= Tony Giffard, 3rd Earl of Halsbury =

British peer and scientist (1908–2000)

John Anthony Hardinge Giffard, 3rd Earl of Halsbury FRS (4 June 1908 – 14 January 2000), was a British crossbencher peer and scientist, succeeding to his title in 1943. A visionary industrialist and public servant who helped develop jet engines and the British computer industry, he also introduced the original private members bill to the House of Lords which eventually became law as Section 28 of the Local Government Act 1988.

He was the grandson of Titanic survivor and fashion designer Lucy Duff-Gordon.

== Early life ==
Giffard was educated at Ludgrove School (where a schoolmaster inspired an interest in astronomy) and Eton. His years at Eton were highly successful, as he was a house captain, rowed in the school eight, and was elected to the small band of school prefects known as Pop.

== Career ==
Giffard was managing director of the National Research Development Corporation 1949–1959, after having been Director of Research of Decca Record Company 1947–1949, and previously worked for Lever Brothers, and Brown-Firth Research Laboratories. Subsequently, he served on many public bodies, including chairing the Committee on Decimal Currency (1961–1963); the review on doctors' and dentists' pay 1971-1974 (from which he resigned) and the Halsbury Report into the pay of nurses and midwives 1974-1975. Between 1966 and 1997 he was Chancellor of Brunel University.

He was President of the British Computer Society during 1969–70. In 1970 he was awarded an Honorary Fellowship of the British Psychological Society.

In addition, he was also a friend of J. R. R. Tolkien and was one of the few people to read The Silmarillion in Tolkien's lifetime, in 1957.

His grandmother was the Edwardian couturiere Lady Duff-Gordon, otherwise known by her professional name Lucile, who was a survivor of the RMS Titanic disaster.

Peerage of the United Kingdom
Preceded by Hardinge Gouburn Giffard	Earl of Halsbury; 1943–2000	Succeeded by Adam Edward Giffard
