= Halsbury Report =

1974 UK report into nursing pay and conditions

- Halsbury Report into the Pay and Related Conditions of Service of Nurses and Midwives 1974
- Established: 23 May 1974
- Dissolved: 1975

The Halsbury Report into the Pay and Related Conditions of Service of Nurses and Midwives 1974 recommended an average 33% pay rise for nurses which was implemented by the then Labour government.

== Context ==
In February 1974 a minority Labour government took office with Barbara Castle as their Secretary of State for Social Services. Her first weeks in office coincided with the Royal College of Nursing (RCN) 'Fair Pay for Nurses' campaign and Castle was quickly made aware of the issues. Nurses across the UK were unhappy with pay and conditions and they became more visible with public demonstrations. Although the unions did not co-ordinate action at this time, it was clear this was a sector-wide issue with a group of COHSE mental health nurses in Huddersfield undertaking their first strike action on 9 May 1974, leaving duty for an hour in five wards.

In London Winifred Prentice, President of the RCN led a group of forty-five representatives to meet with Barbara Castle on 13 May 1974. They presented Castle with 'The State of Nursing' a detailed report setting out concerns on standards of care, staffing, education and training, and pay and whilst they met, several thousand nurses marched through London.

Betty Newstead, Head of the RCN Labour Relations Department gave Castle an ultimatum: if an independent inquiry into pay was not set up within three weeks the RCN would instruct its members to resign en-masse. The RCN would set itself up as an employment agency and offer the nurses on temporary contracts to the NHS at the significantly higher rates that agency workers commanded.

Prior to the meeting Castle had been making positive steps. She had announced the incoming government's support for implementing the 1972 Briggs Report recommendations on education, training, and professional regulation for nurses and midwives. Support that included the allocation of £18 million for the extra tutors required to reform nurse training.

== The committee ==
On 23 May 1974 Castle announced an independent inquiry into the pay and conditions of work of nurses and midwives with Tony Giffard, 3rd Earl of Halsbury as chair. Halsbury had only recently resigned as chair of the outgoing Conservative government's review body on doctors' and dentists' pay (1971–1974). Halsbury 'was reported as believing it foolish to recommend for doctors and dentists anything that required a government to violate its policy' of regulating public pay increases.

Castle appointed Halsbury knowing his position on pay increases. She asserted the need to have women in the committee. A relatively small committee was formed including Harold Atcherley, Professor Ronald Harry Graveson CBE, QC; Mary Green, Ian Wilson Macdonald, Dorothy Wedderburn, and Norah Willis JP.

Whilst the report was being written over the summer, official demonstrations were suspended by most of the nursing organisations, though COHSE and individual nurses continued to demonstrate, with public showing support.

== Recommendations and impact ==
The report was published in September 1974. Castle introduced it in the Nursing Times as a ‘charter of encouragement’ for nurses. ‘It is a shot in the arm for the profession,’ she said. ‘It adjusts the balance between the qualified and unqualified, and is designed imaginatively to encourage the nurse to move up a career structure’.

The report concluded that nurses' pay had fallen significantly behind other groups of workers and that careers in nursing had become relatively unattractive, particularly for men. The committee recommended a simplified grading and pay structure. The report recognised there were more than 415,000 nurses in the NHS, nine out of ten were women, and that due to the vacancy rates there was an overreliance on unregistered nurses. The overall staffing shortage for was approaching 20 per cent, with higher shortages of registered nurses in clinical grades, in mental health nursing and in older people's nursing. The committee recommended a substantial pay increase for those nurses.

The report was received favourably by nursing organisations, but by October Castle had accepted 'Lord Halsbury's offer for his committee to have another look next year at nurses’ pay and make some ‘fine tuning’ of the recommendations in the light of experience.'

The same committee met and produced the 'Supplement to the Report of the Committee of Inquiry into Pay and Related Conditions of Service of Nurses and Midwives' in February 1975. The main recommendation was a substantial pay increase for nursing tutorial grades, ensuring consistency with pay in Further education colleges that had recently been reviewed by the committee of Inquiry into the pay of non-university teachers.

Halsbury recommended an average increase of 33 per cent for nurses, accepted by both the government and the unions and demonstrations ceased.

This notable success for nursing, particularly for the Royal College of Nursing, was short-lived as staff shortages continued and pay erosion as evidenced by the Winter of Discontent. The legislative changes at this time, particularly the Trade Union and Labour Relations Act 1974, the Health and Safety at Work etc. Act 1974, and the Employment Protection Act 1975 restricted the Royal College of Nursing's ability to represent its membership and were a significant driver in their decision to become a Trade union in 1976.
