= Elizabeth Hill (linguist) =

British linguist

Professor Lisa Hill DBE
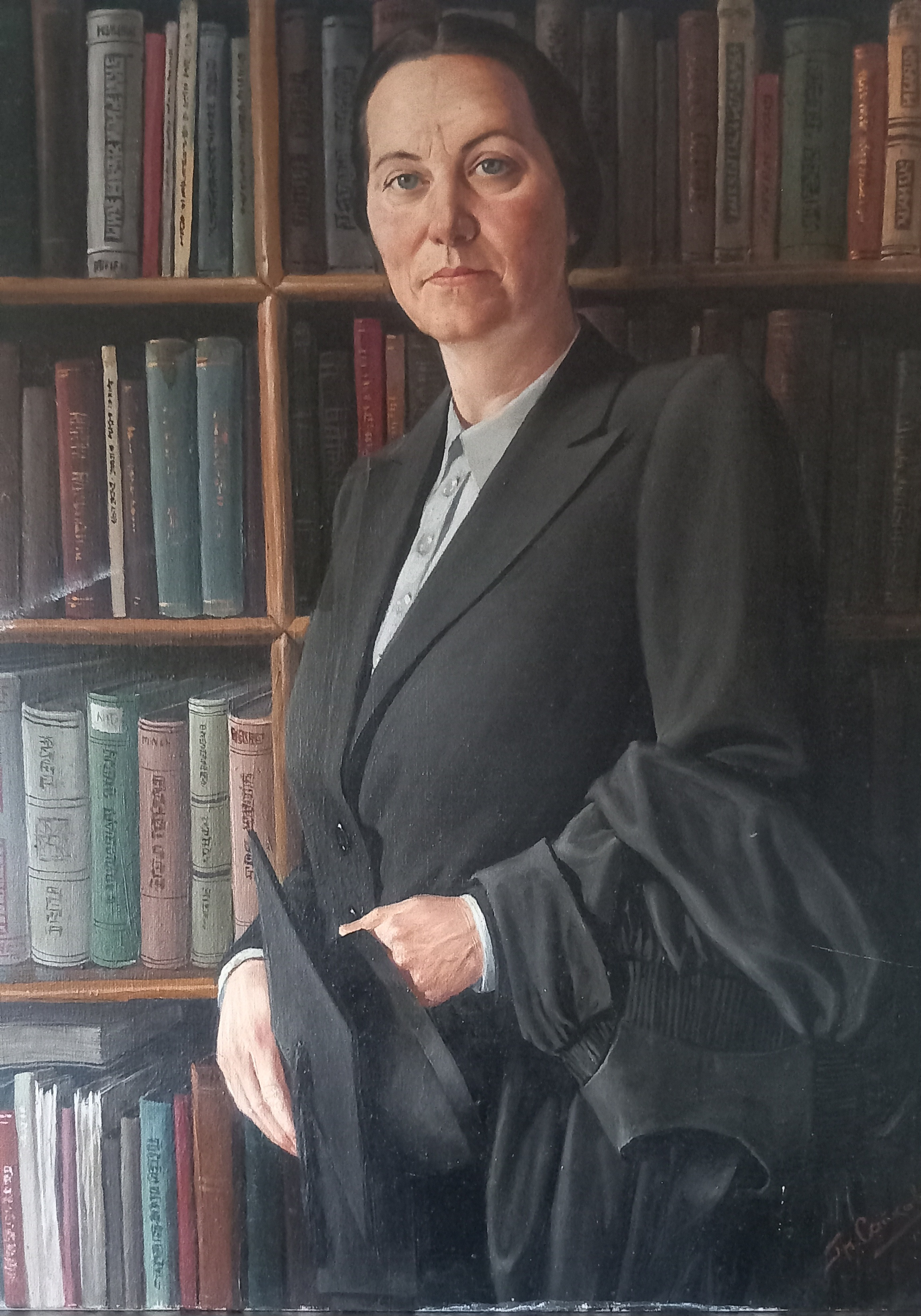
- Portrait of Lisa Hill in 1949
- Born: Yelizaveta Fyodorovna Hill; 24 October 1900; St Petersburg, Russia
- Died: 17 December 1996 (aged 96); Cambridge, England
- Occupation: Linguist
- Spouse: Stojan Veljkovic (m. 1984; div. 1996)

Dame Elizabeth Mary Hill DBE (born Yelizaveta Fyodorovna Hill; Russian Елизаве́та Фёдоровна Хилл; 24 October 1900 – 17 December 1996) was a Russian-born English academic linguist. In addition to a career with the London University School of Slavonic Studies, she was course director of the Joint Services School for Linguists (JSSL), a UK Government training programme to produce linguists and interpreters of Russian, for military and intelligence purposes.

== Background ==
Hill was born on 24 October 1900 in St Petersburg, the fifth of six children (and second of the three daughters) of Frederick William Hill (1860–1924), and his wife, born Luise Sophie Olga Wilhelmine Müller (1862-1928). Her father was a businessman: members of the English Hill family had been trading with Russia since the middle of the eighteenth century. Her mother was a product of the large German-speaking community in Russia. The family had fled the Bolsheviks in 1917 in fear for their lives. Elizabeth celebrated her seventeenth birthday on the ship that carried them away. They relocated to London where they found themselves suddenly all but destitute.

== Career ==
Often known as "Lisa", Hill worked in several language teaching jobs before entering University College London, where she gained a First-class degree in Russian in 1924 and a PhD in 1931. Her first university appointment came in 1936, when she succeeded A.F.Goody as university lecturer in Slavonic studies at Cambridge.

According to her "Who's Who" entry, she was a "Ministry of Information Slavonic Specialist during [the] War of 1939-45" Hill trained military recruits in Russian. A fellow of Girton College, in 1948, she became the first Professor of Slavonic Studies at the University of Cambridge. She held this position until 1968.

== Personal life ==
In 1984, Hill married Stojan Veljkovic, described by one source as a "Serbian aristocrat", but the marriage was dissolved in 1995, shortly before she died. Hill was noted for her 'capacity for long-standing friendships', especially with Doris Mudie, whom Hill first met in the late 1920s in London. In 1936, when Hill had gained her first lectureship, Mudie was reportedly 'penniless' and had suffered the first in a series of nervous breakdowns. Their friendship endured to the end of Mudie's life. Professor Hill is buried in the grounds of the church of St. Andrew & St. Mary, Grantchester.
