= Thomas Tallis School =

Coordinates: 51.4647°N 0.0266°E

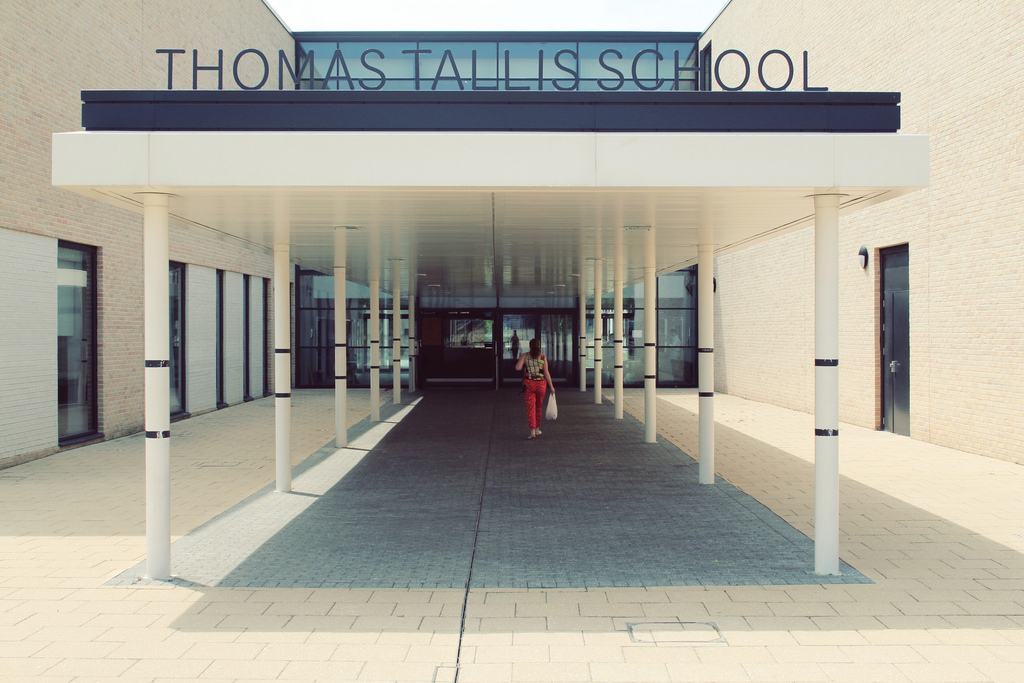

Location
- Kidbrooke Park Road; Kidbrooke, London, SE3 9PX; England

Information
- Type: Community school
- Established: 1971
- Local authority: Greenwich
- Department for Education URN: 100190 Tables
- Ofsted: Reports
- Head teacher: Steve Parsons
- Gender: Coeducational
- Age: 11 to 19
- Enrolment: 1900
- Website: www.thomastallisschool.com

Thomas Tallis School is a large mixed comprehensive school for pupils aged 11–19, located in Kidbrooke in the Royal Borough of Greenwich, London, England. It opened in 1971, and was named after the composer Thomas Tallis, who lived in Greenwich. The school was completely rebuilt 40 years later as part of the Building Schools for the Future programme. It now has 2,035 students.

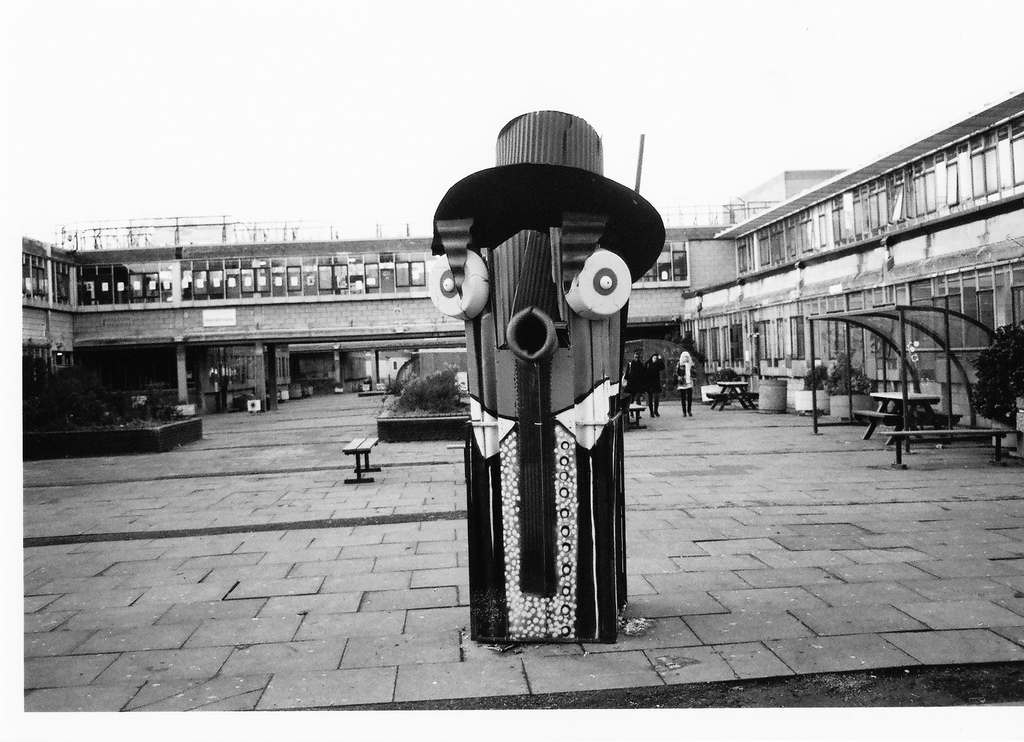
The former Thomas Tallis School concourse.

== History (1971–2011) ==
The school was originally built in 1971 on land used for training facilities in a former RAF storage, maintenance and training facility, RAF Kidbrooke. A blue plaque recognising the school's RAF connections, in particular to the RAF Linguists' Association, was unveiled in 2008 and re-dedicated in July 2014.

In 1998, the school was awarded 'Specialist Arts College' status and was successfully re-designated twice. In 2005 it was awarded Leading Edge status. The school was part of the Creative Partnerships network of schools from its inception in 2002, through to 2011 (in May 2008, the school was one of only 30 schools in England to achieve the status of School of Creativity).

In December 2009, Director of Tate galleries, Sir Nicholas Serota was invited to become the school's head teacher for the day.

=== Kidbrooke School in the media ===
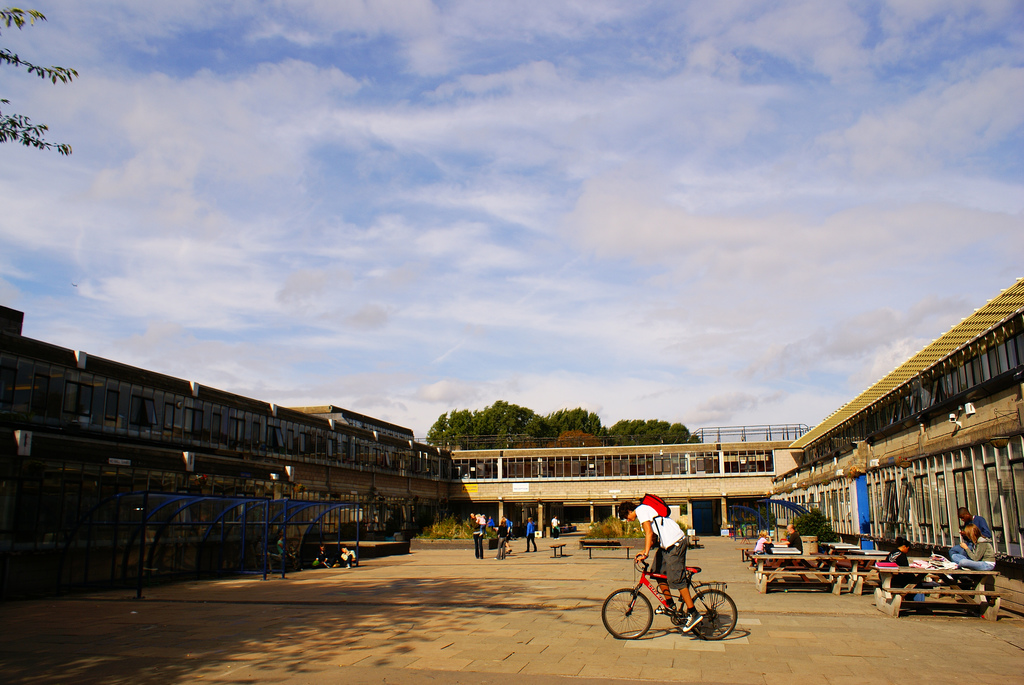
The former Thomas Tallis School concourse.

In 2005, along with the nearby Halley Academy, the school featured in Jamie Oliver's TV series Jamie's School Dinners in which Oliver sought to improve school dinners in Britain. In 2007, the school featured in the Channel 4 documentary Make Me a Tory, directed by former pupil Daniel Cormack.

Two education textbooks designed by German publisher Ernst Klett Verlag are set at the school.

== History (2011–present) ==
In 2011, the school underwent a £50 million pound renovation as part of the Greenwich Building Schools for the Future programme. Occupancy of the new school took place on 7 November 2011. The school was officially opened by David Miliband in May 2012. The architects were John McAslan + Partners. Designers Gilles and Cecilie Studio were commissioned to create new furniture, wall graphics and decorations for the school. The aim of this project was to express the ethos and ambitions of the old school on the walls of the new one. The work was featured in Creative Review magazine (and received a diploma in environmental design at the Visuelt awards in Norway).

A number of places at the school are for students with autistic spectrum disorder (ASD). Since 1997, the school has had a Deaf Support Centre, integrating deaf pupils alongside their hearing peers, with specialist staff supporting teaching staff to ensure deaf students' needs are met. Deaf Awareness is part of the pastoral programme for all students.

== Notable former pupils ==
- Dominic Cooper, actor
- Simon Day, actor
- Amadou Kassaraté, professional footballer
- Richard Reid, failed 'Shoe Bomber' terrorist
- Ihsan Rustem, dancer and choreographer
- Kae Tempest, poet
- Elliott List, professional footballer
- Jake Reeves, professional footballer
- Otesha Charles, professional footballer
- Naomi Wakszlak, english actress
