= Stracathro Hospital =

- NHS Tayside
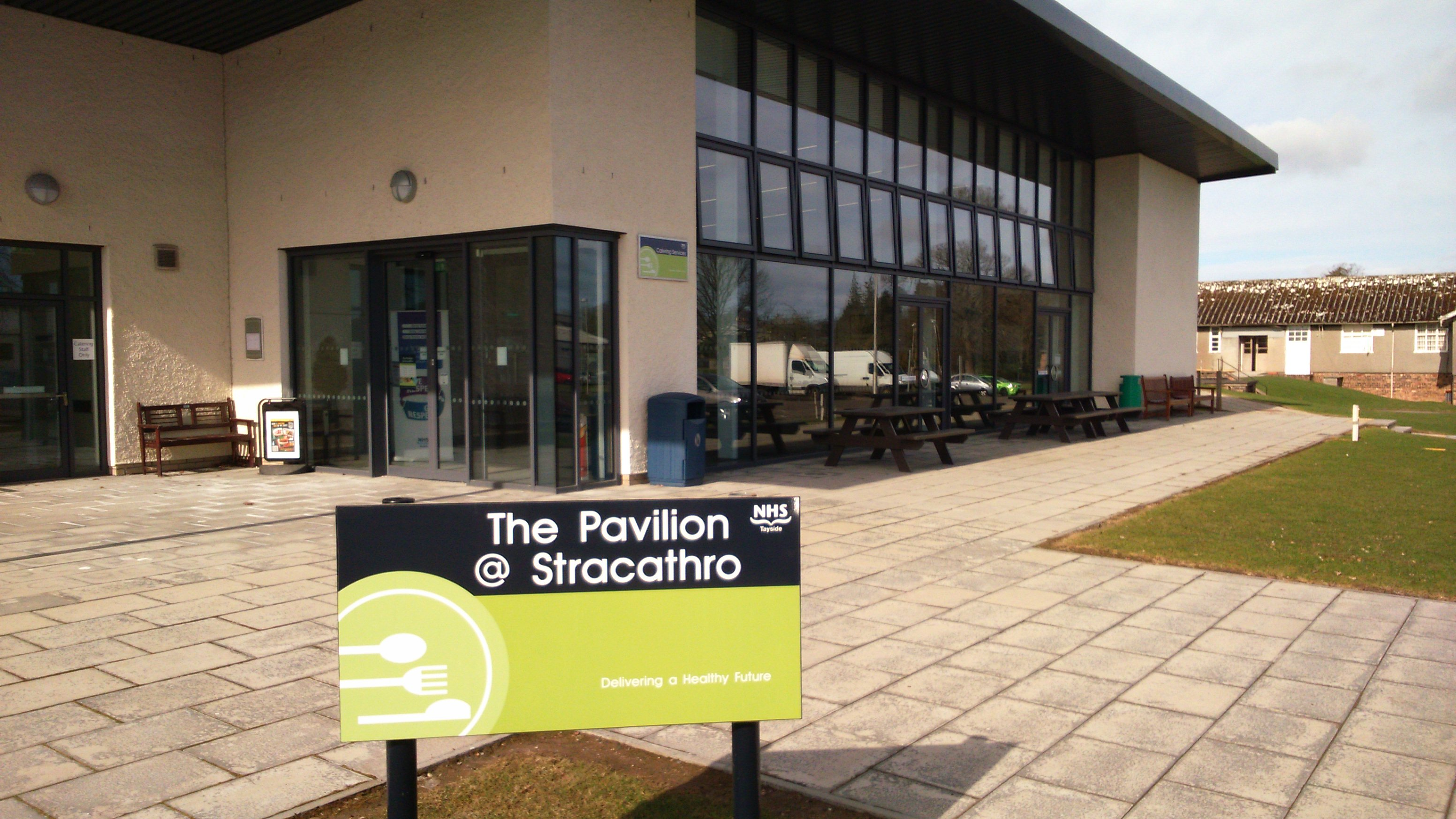
- Stracathro Hospital

- Shown in Angus

Geography
- Location: near Brechin, Angus, Scotland
- Coordinates: 56.7764°N 2.6156°W

Organisation
- Care system: NHS Scotland
- Type: District Hospital

Services
- Emergency department: No

Links
- Website: www.nhstayside.scot.nhs.uk/patients/hospital/Stracathro/Stracathro.shtml
- Lists: Hospitals in Scotland

Stracathro Hospital is a community hospital in Angus, Scotland. Established as a wartime Emergency Hospital Service facility during the Second World War, it was afterward developed as a District General Hospital. Since 2005 it has been the site of the Scottish Regional Treatment Centre.

== History ==
The hospital was designed as one of seven Emergency Hospital Service facilities for military casualties. It was established in the grounds of Stracathro House in 1939, early in the Second World War. The single-storey wards could accommodate up to 1,000 patients, and the mansion house provided accommodation for staff.

The first patients were victims of an air raid on Montrose in 1940. These were followed by civilian casualties from English cities, including London, Birmingham and Coventry, and later by soldiers from all theatres of the war. Long trains would deliver the wounded to Brechin station. A new nurse training school was created at the hospital as there was a significant shortage of nurses. Winifred Prentice (who would become President of the Royal College of Nursing) joined Stracathro, first as a nurse tutor, but from 1961 as Matron, a post she held for twenty five years.

The hospital joined the National Health Service in 1948 and later developed as a rural general hospital, serving a local population of about 110,000.

In 1998, almost overnight, emergency general surgery was moved to Ninewells Hospital. This threatened the future of the hospital, and led to speculation that it might close. The speculation increased when the Tayside Acute Services Review, carried out in 2001, recommended a completely new hospital in Angus. Closure of the coronary care unit later that year limited thrombolysis service in the community to what paramedics could provide.

In 2005, the Scottish Regional Treatment Centre was developed at Stracathro. This was a joint venture between the NHS and the private sector; it included £15 million funding from the Scottish Executive. The SRTC caters for NHS patients from Grampian, Tayside and Fife Health Boards. Amicus Health, a subsidiary of General Healthcare Group, the UK's largest private hospital group, was awarded a contract to deliver 8,000 episodes of elective surgery in orthopaedics, urology, general surgery, and gastroenterology at Stracathro Hospital from 2006.

The Susan Carnegie Centre, which houses three inpatient mental health units and a mental health day unit, opened in December 2011.

== Transportation ==
The hospital is located beside the A90 and is on multiple bus routes.
