= Kidbrooke =

Area of south-east London, England

Coordinates: 51.4621°N 0.0273°E

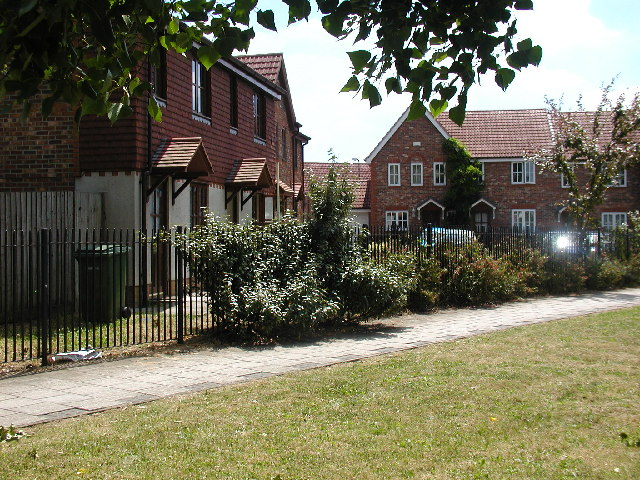
- Nelson Mandela Road, Kidbrooke

- Location within Greater London
- Population: 14,300 (2011 Census: Kidbrooke with Hornfair Ward)
- OS grid reference: TQ413760
  - Charing Cross: 7.5 mi (12.1 km) WNW
- London borough: Greenwich
- Ceremonial county: Greater London
- Region: London
- Country: England
- Sovereign state: United Kingdom
- Post town: LONDON
- Postcode district: SE3, SE9
- Dialling code: 020
- Police: Metropolitan
- Fire: London
- Ambulance: London
- UK Parliament: Greenwich and Woolwich; Eltham and Chislehurst
- London Assembly: Greenwich and Lewisham

Kidbrooke is an area of south-east London, England, in the Royal Borough of Greenwich 7 1/2 miles (12 km) south-east of Charing Cross and north west of Eltham.

The district takes its name from the Kyd Brook, a watercourse which runs from Orpington to Lewisham, by which point it is part of the River Quaggy. It is a tributary to the River Ravensbourne.

== History ==
Kidbrooke, derived from an Anglo-Saxon name meaning 'the brook where the kites were seen,' indicates that the area was uninhabited at the time of naming. With its three streams and heavy, wet clay, Kidbrooke would have been unsuitable for Saxon settlement.

However, by the late 11th or 12th century, Kidbrooke had established a church and likely had a small population, although this presence didn't endure. By 1428, the church lacked a priest, and by 1494, it had fallen into disrepair.

Remaining rural until the inauguration of Kidbrooke railway station in 1895, the region was primarily dedicated to farming until the 1930s. Significant development ensued, particularly following the construction of the Rochester Way. On 1 April 1901 the civil parish was abolished to form Charlton and Kidbrooke. At the 1891 census (one of the last before the abolition of the parish), Kidbrooke had a population of 2298.

=== Housing ===
A map showing the Kidbrooke ward of Greenwich Metropolitan Borough as it appeared in 1916

The area contains a large amount of 1920s and 1930s domestic housing, developed partly as the Kidbrooke Park Estate, between Shooters Hill and Rochester Way.

A large RAF stores base, RAF Kidbrooke, formerly occupied much of the land around Kidbrooke railway station, north and south of the railway line. In 1965 the Government released most of the land to the Greater London Council for housing. The Ferrier Estate, built from 1968, was conceived to be a flagship scheme but became one of the largest and most deprived council housing developments in London.

The housing estate was demolished in 2012 and has been redeveloped as Kidbrooke Village, a development of 5,300 homes masterplanned by Lifschutz Davidson Sandilands with Design and Build MEP contractor Cilantro Engineering.

== Features ==
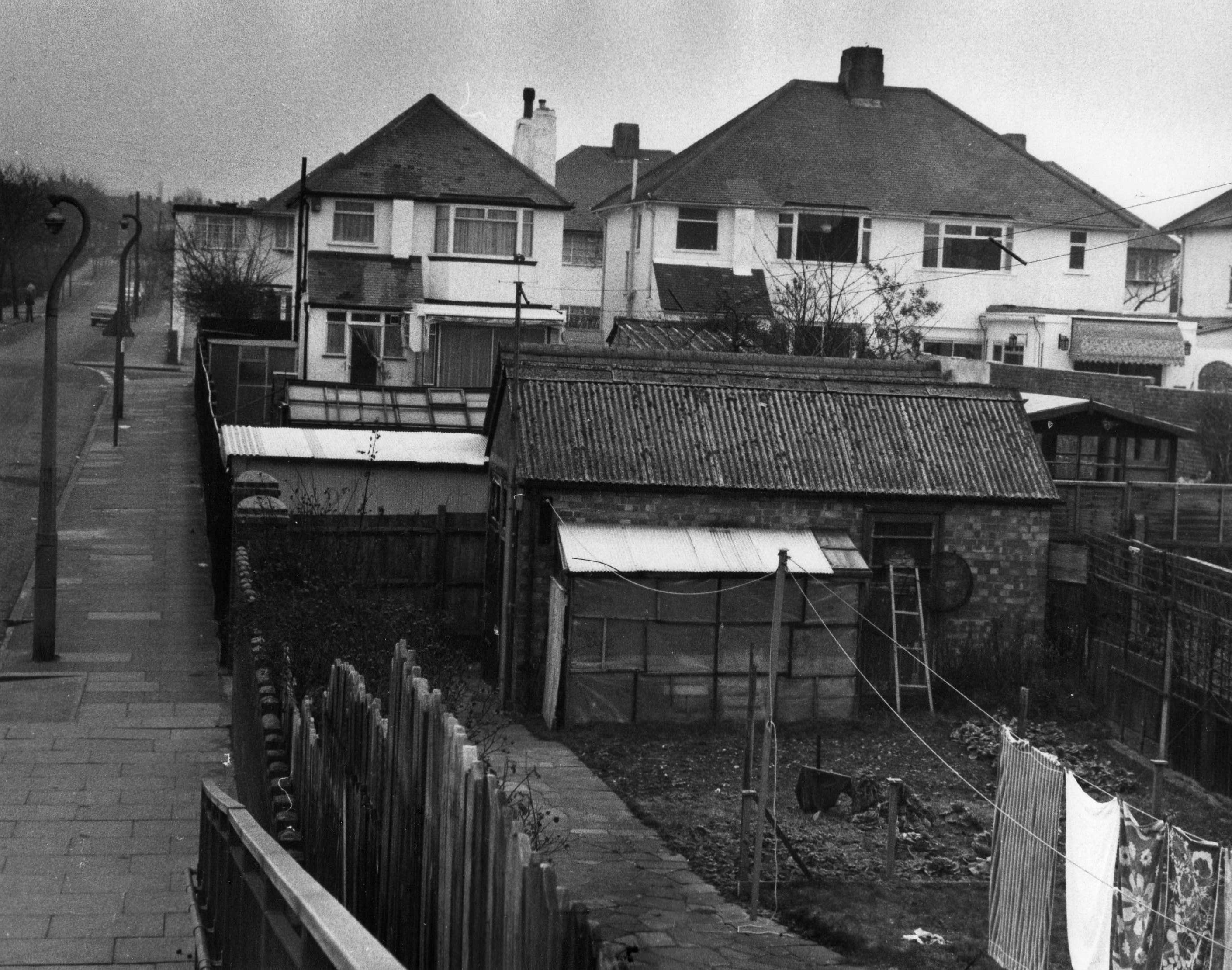
Houses and gardens in Kidbrooke, January 1980

Immediately south of the former Ferrier Estate is Sutcliffe Park which includes a lake, acting as a flood defence, and created by partly releasing the Kyd Brook from concrete conduits underground in which it had run until 2006.

Rochester Way, a road which was built along much of the course of the old country lane Kidbrooke Lane, was intended as a bypass for Shooters Hill to the north. Rochester Way has itself now been bypassed by a dual carriageway – part of the A2 road – built in the 1980s over most of Kidbrooke Green. A small remaining piece of this open land, alongside the road, is now Kidbrooke Green Park, and adjacent to that, a small nature reserve managed by Greenwich Council. The nature reserve is visible, but not open to the public.

Little sign of the former RAF base remains. A handful of buildings survive, south of the houses of Nelson Mandela Road, to the north of the railway line, that escaped demolition when the Rochester Way Relief Road dual carriageway was constructed. These are currently used for additional collection storage by the National Maritime Museum, with some now removed to make way for a new purpose-built conservation facility, the Prince Philip Maritime Collections Centre, which opened in 2019.

To the west of this Thomas Tallis School is built on another part of the former base, the former site of a prisoner-of-war camp, barrage balloon centre, and then a military language-teaching facility. (There are several other military facilities in the general vicinity, which is also close to a surviving base in Woolwich, long home to the Royal Artillery and now to other parts of the British Army.)

== Transport ==
=== Rail ===
Kidbrooke railway station provides the area with Southeastern services to London Victoria, London Charing Cross, London Cannon Street, Dartford and Slade Green.

=== Buses ===
Kidbrooke is served by London Buses routes 132, 178, 286, 335, 386 and B16. These connect it with areas including Bexleyheath, Blackheath, Eltham, Greenwich, Lewisham, North Greenwich, Sidcup, Welling and Woolwich.

=== Roads ===
The A2 road gives the area rapid access to the London Inner Ring Road, the South Circular Road and the M25 motorway.

== Education ==
=== Primary schools ===
- Wingfield School
- Kidbrooke Park
- Holy Family R.C.
- Henwick Primary School
- Ealdham Primary School

=== Secondary schools ===
- The Halley Academy — opened in 1954 as Kidbrooke School; the first purpose-built comprehensive school in Britain and became an academy in 2011 as Corelli College
- Thomas Tallis School — opened in 1971

== Notable inhabitants ==
Famous residents have included comedian Jim Davidson, who grew up in Holburne Road; interior designer Lawrence Llewelyn Bowen, who lived in a bungalow on Kidbrooke Park Road until 2004; and singer Sandie Shaw. Former AFC Bournemouth player Junior Stanislas was born in Kidbrooke. Tessa Murray met Greg Hughes by chance at Kidbrooke Railway Station which later led to the formation of dream-pop band Still Corners.

== See also ==
- List of people from Greenwich
- List of schools in Greenwich
- Kidbrooke Village

=== Roads ===
- County of London Plan
- London Ringways
- East Cross Route
