= Kidbrooke railway station =

National Rail station in London, England

Kidbrooke
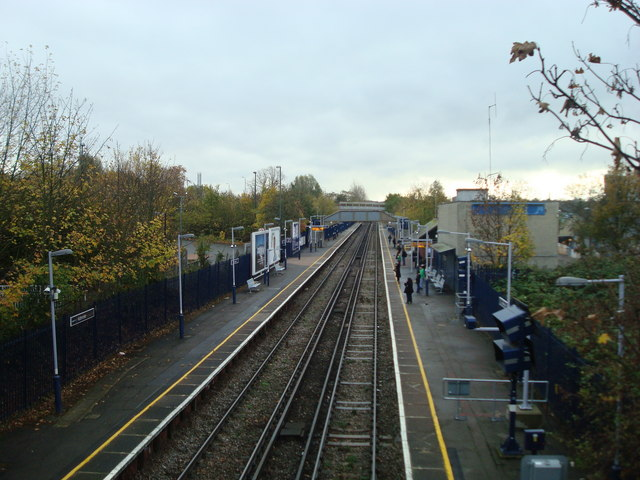
- Interactive map of Kidbrooke

General information
- Location: Kidbrooke
- Local authority: Royal Borough of Greenwich
- Managed by: Southeastern
- Station code: KDB
- DfT category: D
- Number of platforms: 2
- Accessible: Yes
- Fare zone: 3

National Rail annual entry and exit
- 2020–21: ▼0.430 million
- 2021–22: ▲1.011 million
- 2022–23: ▲1.201 million
- 2023–24: ▲1.412 million
- 2024–25: ▲1.621 million

Key dates
- 1 May 1895: Opened

Other information
- External links: Departures; Facilities
- Coordinates: 51.4621°N 0.0273°E

Kidbrooke railway station serves Kidbrooke in the Royal Borough of Greenwich, south-east London. It is 9 miles 51 chains (15.5 km) measured from London Victoria.

The station and all trains serving it are operated by Southeastern.

== Location ==
The station is on the Bexleyheath line, and opened when the line began operating on 1 May 1895. The original station buildings here remained in place until 1972, when they were replaced with a CLASP prefabricated structure, and this in turn was replaced in 1994 by a brown-brick construction with a tiled pitched roof. A new interim station building was opened in 2014 as part of a phased development here, linked to the total rebuild of the Ferrier Estate (now called Kidbrooke Village). A brand new station building was opened on 3 April 2021.

To the west of the station is the short Kidbrooke Tunnel. A goods yard at the station was closed, along with those at Eltham Well Hall and Bexleyheath stations, on 7 October 1968.

== Services ==
All services at Kidbrooke are operated by Southeastern using Class 376, 465, 466 and 707 EMUs.

The typical off-peak service in trains per hour is:

- 2 tph to London Victoria
- 1 tph to London Charing Cross
- 2 tph to London Cannon Street
- 2 tph to Slade Green, continuing to London Cannon Street via Woolwich Arsenal and Greenwich
- 3 tph to Dartford

During the peak hours, the service between London Charing Cross and Dartford is increased to 2 tph in each direction.

Preceding station	National Rail	Following station
Blackheath	Southeastern Bexleyheath Line	Eltham

== Connections ==
London Buses routes 178, 335 and B16 serve the station.
