= List of schools in the Royal Borough of Greenwich =

This is a list of schools in the Royal Borough of Greenwich in London, England.

== State-funded schools ==
=== Primary schools ===
- Alderwood Primary School
- Alexander McLeod Primary School
- Bannockburn Primary School
- Bishop John Robinson CE Primary School
- Boxgrove Primary School
- Brooklands Primary School
- Cardwell Primary School
- Charlton Manor Primary School
- Cherry Orchard Primary School
- Christ Church CE Primary School, Greenwich
- Christ Church CE Primary School, Shooters Hill
- Conway Primary School
- De Lucy Primary School
- Deansfield Primary School
- Discovery Primary School
- Ealdham Primary School
- Eglinton Primary School
- Eltham CE Primary School
- Fossdene Primary School
- Foxfield Primary School
- Gallions Mount Primary School
- Gordon Primary School
- Greenacres Primary School
- Greenslade Primary School
- Haimo Primary School
- Halstow Primary School
- Hawksmoor School
- Henwick Primary School
- Heronsgate Primary School
- Holy Family RC Primary School
- Horn Park Primary School
- Invicta Primary School
- James Wolfe Primary School
- Kidbrooke Park Primary School
- Linton Mead Primary School
- Meridian Primary School
- Middle Park Primary School
- Millennium Primary School
- Montbelle Primary School
- Morden Mount Primary School
- Mulgrave Primary School
- Nightingale Primary School
- Notre Dame RC Primary School
- Our Lady of Grace RC Primary School
- Plumcroft Primary School
- Rockliffe Manor Primary School
- St Alfege with St Peter’s CE Primary School
- St Joseph’s RC Primary School
- St Margaret Clitherow RC Primary School
- St Margaret’s CE Primary School
- St Mary Magdalene CE All Through School
- St Mary’s RC Primary School
- St Patrick’s RC Primary School
- St Peter’s RC Primary School
- St Thomas A Becket RC Primary School
- St Thomas More RC Primary School
- Sherington Primary School
- South Rise Primary School
- Thorntree Primary School
- Timbercroft Primary School
- Windrush Primary School
- Wingfield Primary School
- Woodhill Primary School
- Wyborne Primary School

=== Secondary schools ===
- Ark Greenwich Free School
- Eltham Hill School
- Harris Academy Greenwich
- Leigh Academy Blackheath
- Leigh Stationers' Academy
- Plumstead Manor School
- St Mary Magdalene CE All Through School
- St Paul's Academy
- St Thomas More Catholic School
- St Ursula's Convent School
- The Halley Academy
- The John Roan School
- Thomas Tallis School
- Woolwich Polytechnic School for Boys
- Woolwich Polytechnic School for Girls

=== Special and alternative schools ===
- Charlton Park Academy
- King's Oak School
- Newhaven Pupil Referral Unit
- Waterside School
- Willow Dene School

=== Further education ===
- Anglian College London
- Greenwich Community College
- Shooters Hill Sixth Form College

== Independent schools ==
=== Primary and preparatory schools ===
- Blackheath Preparatory School
- The Pointer School
- St Olave's Preparatory School

=== Senior and all-through schools ===
- Blackheath High School
- Colfe's School
- Greenwich Engineering and Medical School
- Greenwich Steiner School
- Riverston School

=== Special and alternative schools ===
- Pulse and Water College
- Right Choice Independent Special School
- Serenity School
- Social Arts for Education
- StreetVibes Media Academy
- Wize Up
