= St Mary Magdalene Woolwich =

Coordinates: 51.4930°N 0.0592°E

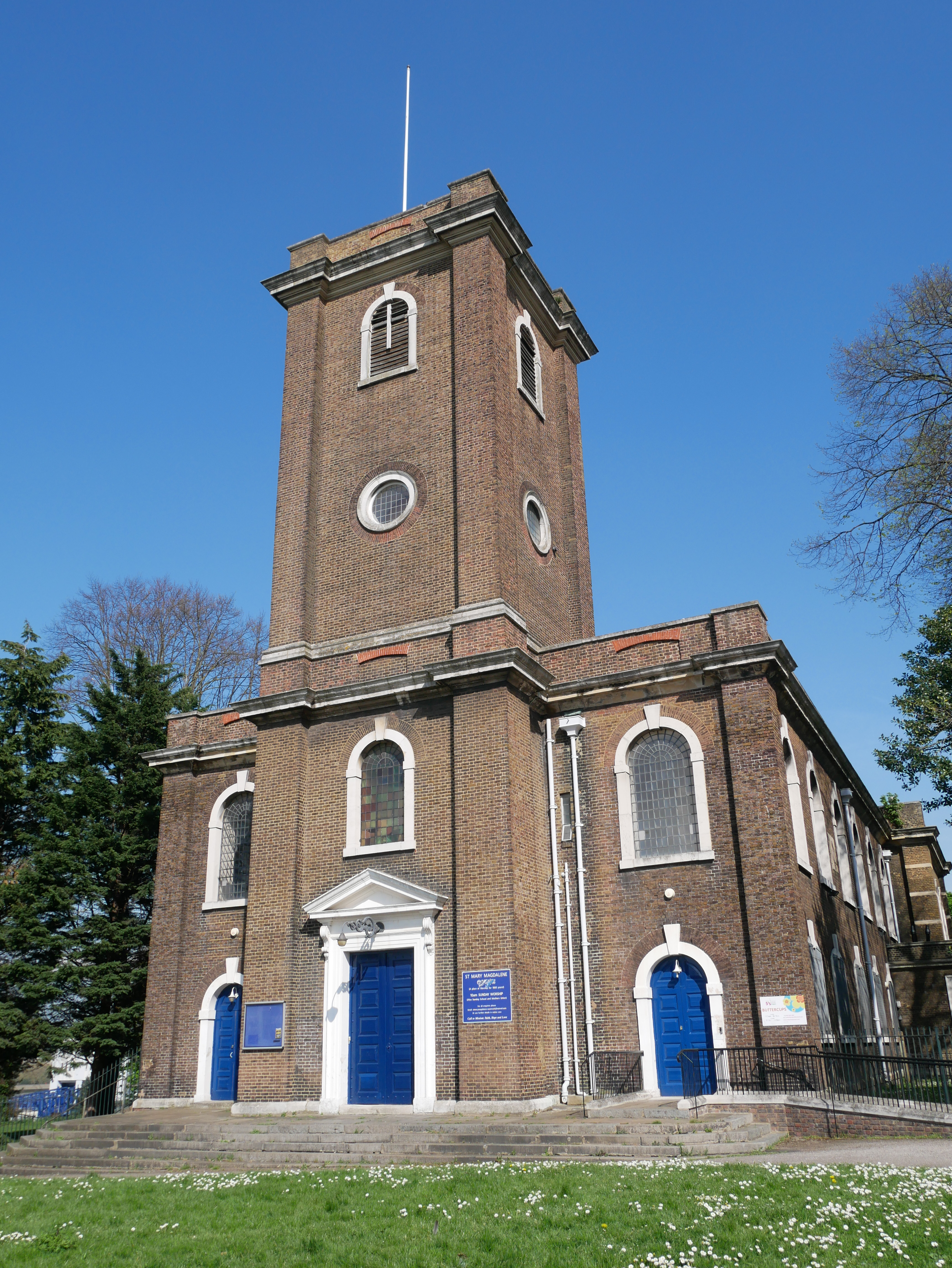
- Southwest view of the church
- St Mary Magdalene Woolwich
- OS grid reference: TQ 43068 79124
- Location: Woolwich, Royal Borough of Greenwich, London
- Country: England
- Denomination: Church of England
- Churchmanship: Central
- Website: www.achurchnearyou.com/woolwich-st-mary-magdalene/

History
- Status: Parish church
- Dedication: Mary Magdalene
- Dedicated: 9 May 1740

Architecture
- Functional status: Active
- Heritage designation: Grade B listed
- Years built: 1732–1739

Administration
- Province: Province of Canterbury
- Diocese: Diocese of Southwark
- Archdeaconry: Lewisham and Greenwich
- Parish: Woolwich St. Mary Magdalene with St. Michael and All Angels

Clergy
- Rector: The Revd Jesse van der Valk

St Mary Magdalene Woolwich is an 18th-century Anglican church dedicated to St Mary Magdalene in Woolwich, southeast London, England.

== History ==
Christianity in Woolwich goes back to the Early Middle Ages. In 2015 Oxford Archaeology discovered a Saxon burial site in the area close to the Thames east of Woolwich Ferry. It contained 76 skeletons from the late 7th or early 8th century. The absence of grave deposits indicates that this was an early Christian settlement. The first church in Woolwich was probably pre-Norman conquest and dedicated to Saint Lawrence. It stood on a promontory about 37 m north of the present-day church, more or less where the belvedere overlooking the river now is. The church was slightly separate from the early riverside settlement in Old Woolwich. From the early 10th till the mid-12th century Woolwich was ruled by the abbots of St. Peter's Abbey in Ghent, probably as a result of a gift from Ælfthryth, daughter of King Alfred and Countess of Flanders. Around 1100 Henry I gave the church to Gundulf of Rochester, bishop and prior of Rochester Cathedral. It was probably around this time that the church was rebuilt in stone. The church tower with walls of chalk and flint was partly excavated in 1970.

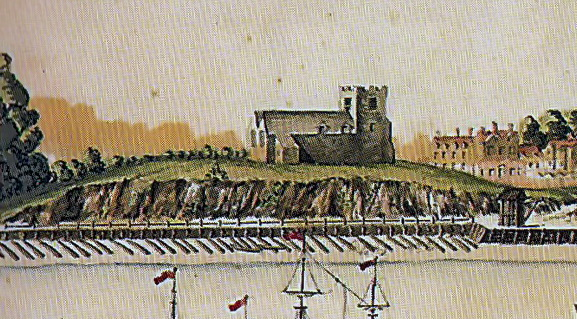
The medieval church in 1699

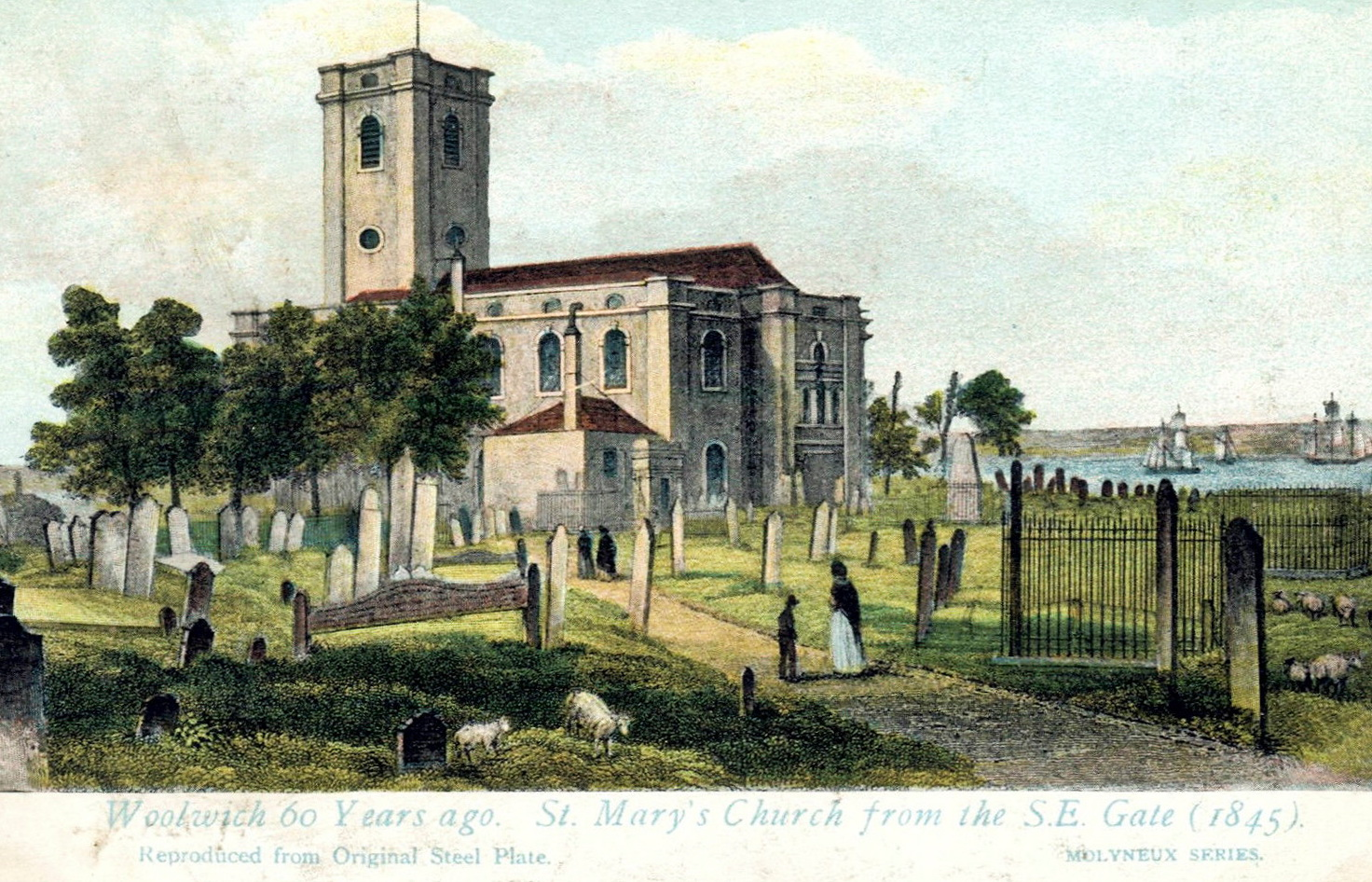
The churchyard around 1840

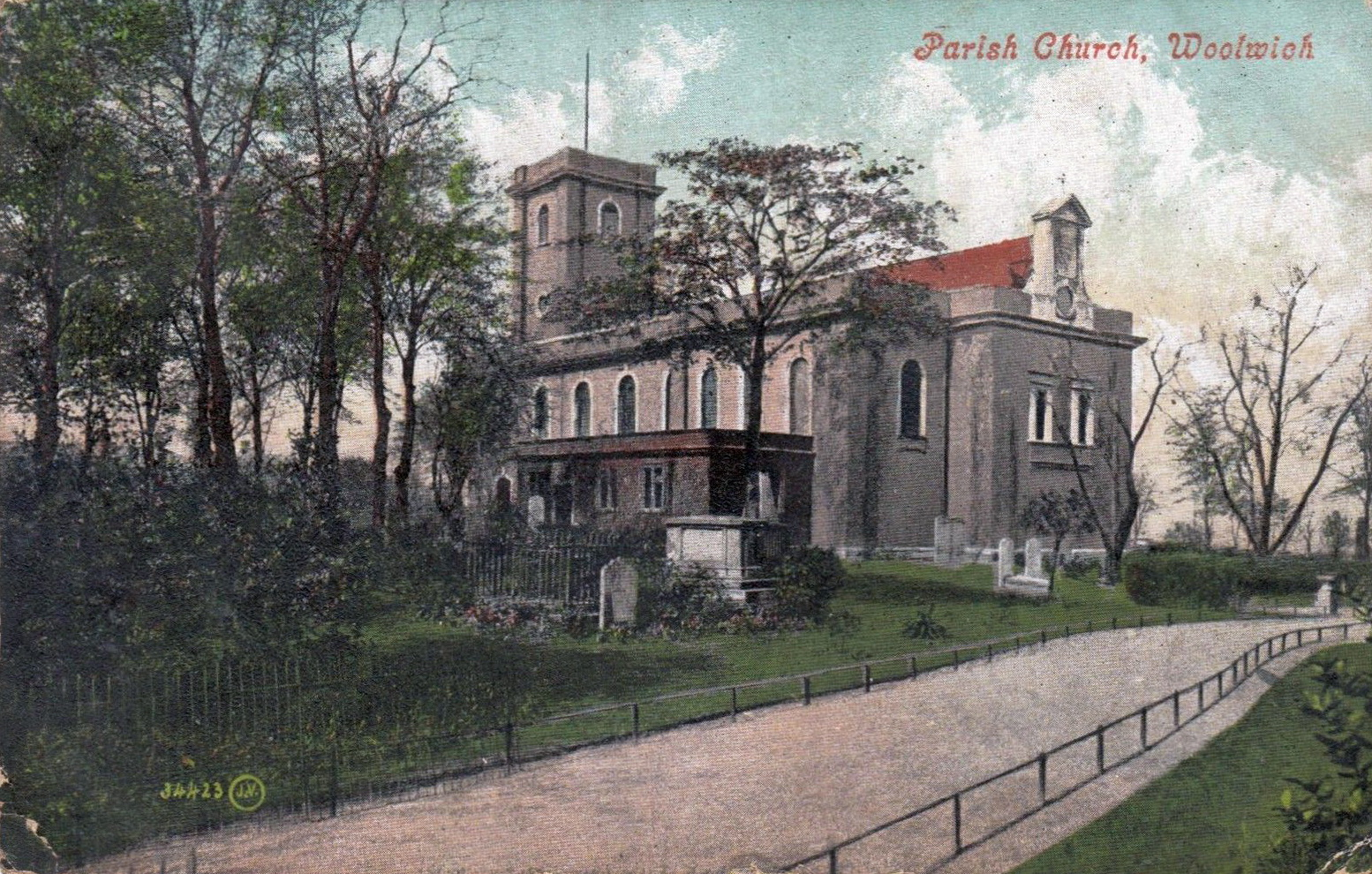
St Mary's Gardens, c. 1900

Church at Woolwich Act 1731
- Act of Parliament
- Parliament of Great Britain
- Long title: An Act for re-building the Parish Church of Woolwich, in the County of Kent, as One of the Fifty new Churches directed to be built by Two Acts of Parliament, One made in the Ninth, and the other in the Tenth, Year of the Reign of Her late Majesty Queen Anne.
- Citation: 5 Geo. 2. c. 4
- Territorial extent: Great Britain

Dates
- Royal assent: 20 March 1732
- Commencement: 13 January 1732 (Note: Start of session.)
- Repealed: 31 January 2013
Other legislation
Repealed by	Statute Law (Repeals) Act 2013

Status: Repealed

Text of statute as originally enacted

The parish church was first dedicated to Saint Lawrence, then, in the 15th century, to the Virgin Mary and, a century later, to Saint Mary Magdalene. The first known rector was John Chaplain, mentioned in 1182. In the late 14th century rector William de Prene rebuilt the bell tower. In the early 16th century rector John Sweetyng assisted in building the Great Harry at Woolwich Dockyard. Rectors of Woolwich in the late 17th century included Thomas Lindsay (1686–1694) and Philip Stubbs (1694–1699).

By the 18th century the Elizabethan spire had collapsed and the foundations were showing signs of strain. Thus a new church (the present one) was built from 1732 to 1739, close to the medieval church's site. An architect's name is not known; there probably was none. Plain brick churches with round-headed windows had been built in the London area since the 1670s. The new church was part-funded by the Commission for Building Fifty New Churches and built by Matthew Spray, a bricklayer from Deptford. A total of 636,000 bricks were used. Dedication took place on 9 May 1740, after which the old church was demolished and the churchyard extended and walled in.

In 1875 Adelbert Anson was appointed rector of Woolwich. The 34-year old clergyman had several architects work on designs for a new church, the most ambitious one in Gothic Revival style by James Brooks. Nothing happened and Anson's successor, Samuel Gilbert Scott, prepared plans for a new chancel (including a crypt) and vestries, designed by his cousin J.O. Scott. These were completed in 1894, two years after Scott's resignation. His successor was Charles Escreet, whose family are named as benefactors of the church on their memorial. Around the same time the churchyard was transformed into a public garden. Some alterations to the interior were made in 1924.

The church suffered little damage during World War II, during which years Cuthbert Bardsley, later Bishop of Coventry, was a socially active rector. The building was Grade B listed in 1954, which corresponds to Grade II and Grade II* in the modern scheme. In 1960 another young and socially innovative rector arrived in Woolwich, Nicolas Stacey. His "Woolwich Project" (1960–68) was controversial but brought new life to the church. Among the many changes, he had the aisles and galleries shut off with frosted glass panels to make a cafe and offices, before converting the crypt into a youth club. The "Coffee House" was opened by Princess Margaret and Antony Armstrong-Jones in May 1961. Also, starting in 1965 (and ending in 2001), Stacey brought in the local Presbyterians to meet up with the Anglicans. In the 1970s the parish of St Mary Magdalene was merged into the three-church parish of Woolwich. Some restoration work was done in 1977, and in 2008 the gallery partitions were removed, restoring the spatial integrity of the building.

In May 2019 St Mary's Church and Gardens became part of a conservation area. The Woolwich Conservation Area comprises the Bathway Quarter, parts of Woolwich New Road, General Gordon Square, Greens End, Beresford Square, Powis Street, Hare Street, Mortgramit Square, and parts of Woolwich High Street (south).

== The building ==
=== Exterior ===
The site of the church is at the extremity of a spur reaching northwards towards the Thames. The church is brick-built, with Portland stone plinth cappings, copings, window surrounds and the principal cornice. The bell tower, protruding from the west front, is topped off rather bluntly, without a balustrade, spire or lantern. The 1894 brick chancel features Bath stone buttress capping, band courses and a pedimented gable top.

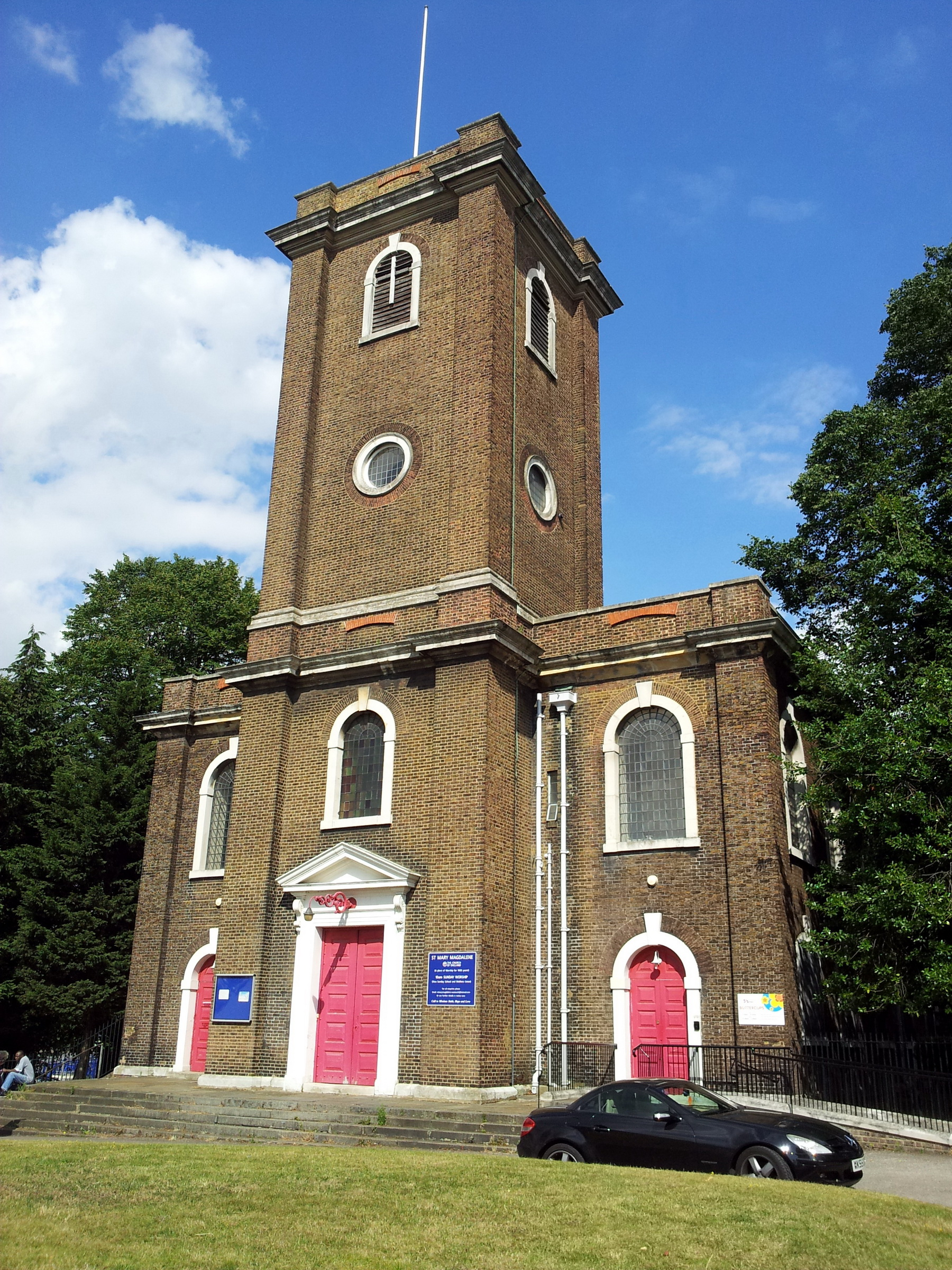
West facade

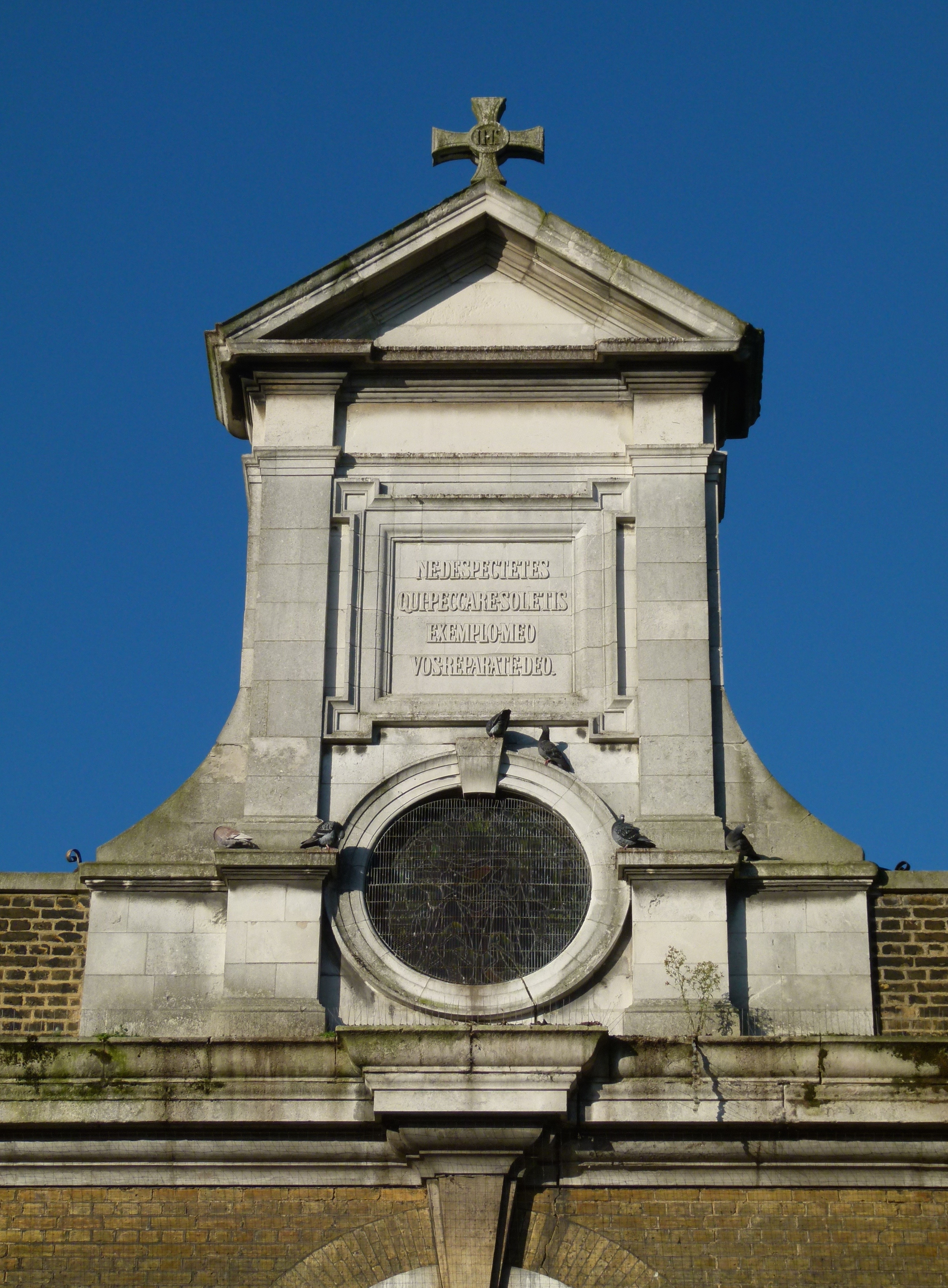
Detail east facade

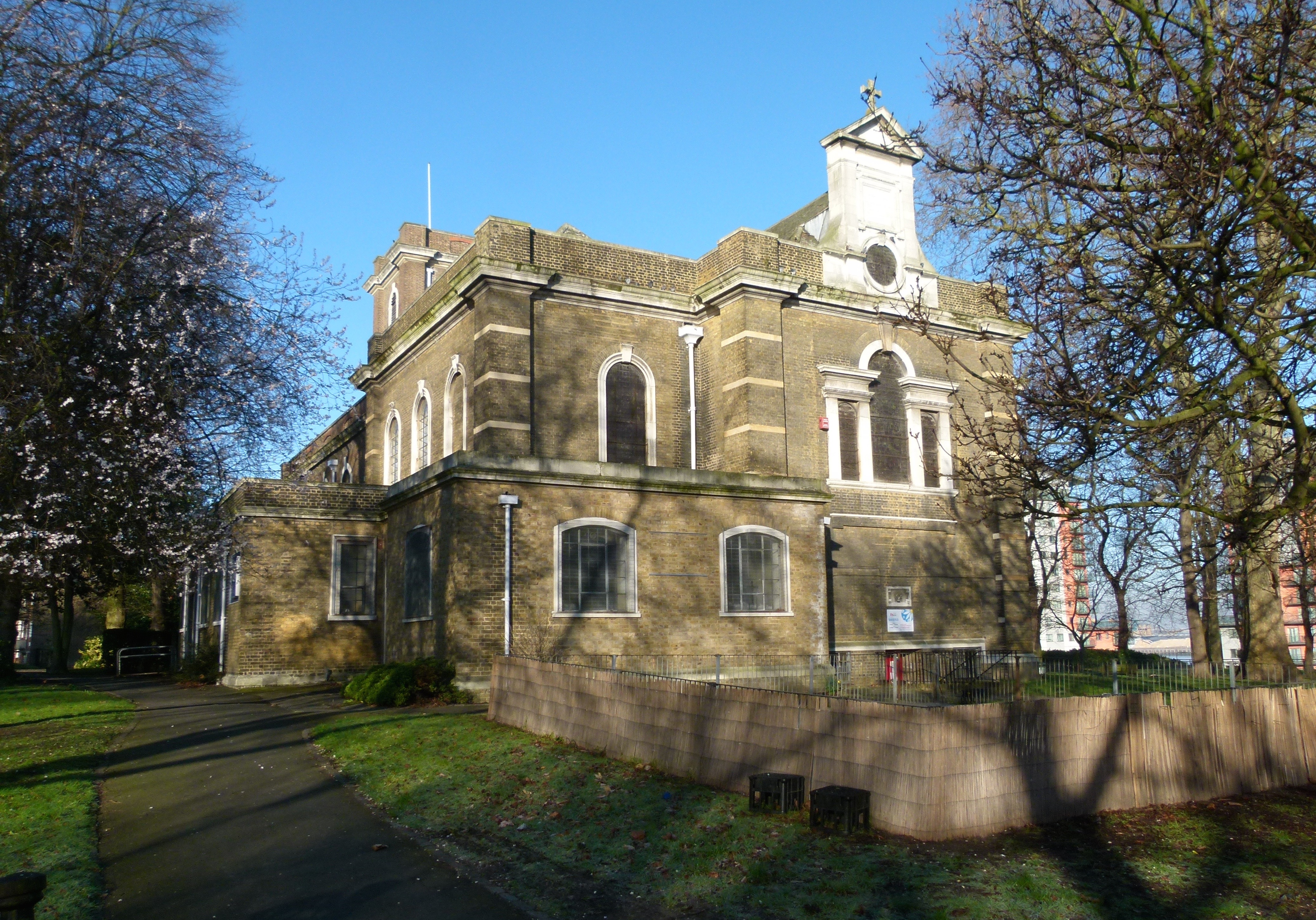
View from the southeast

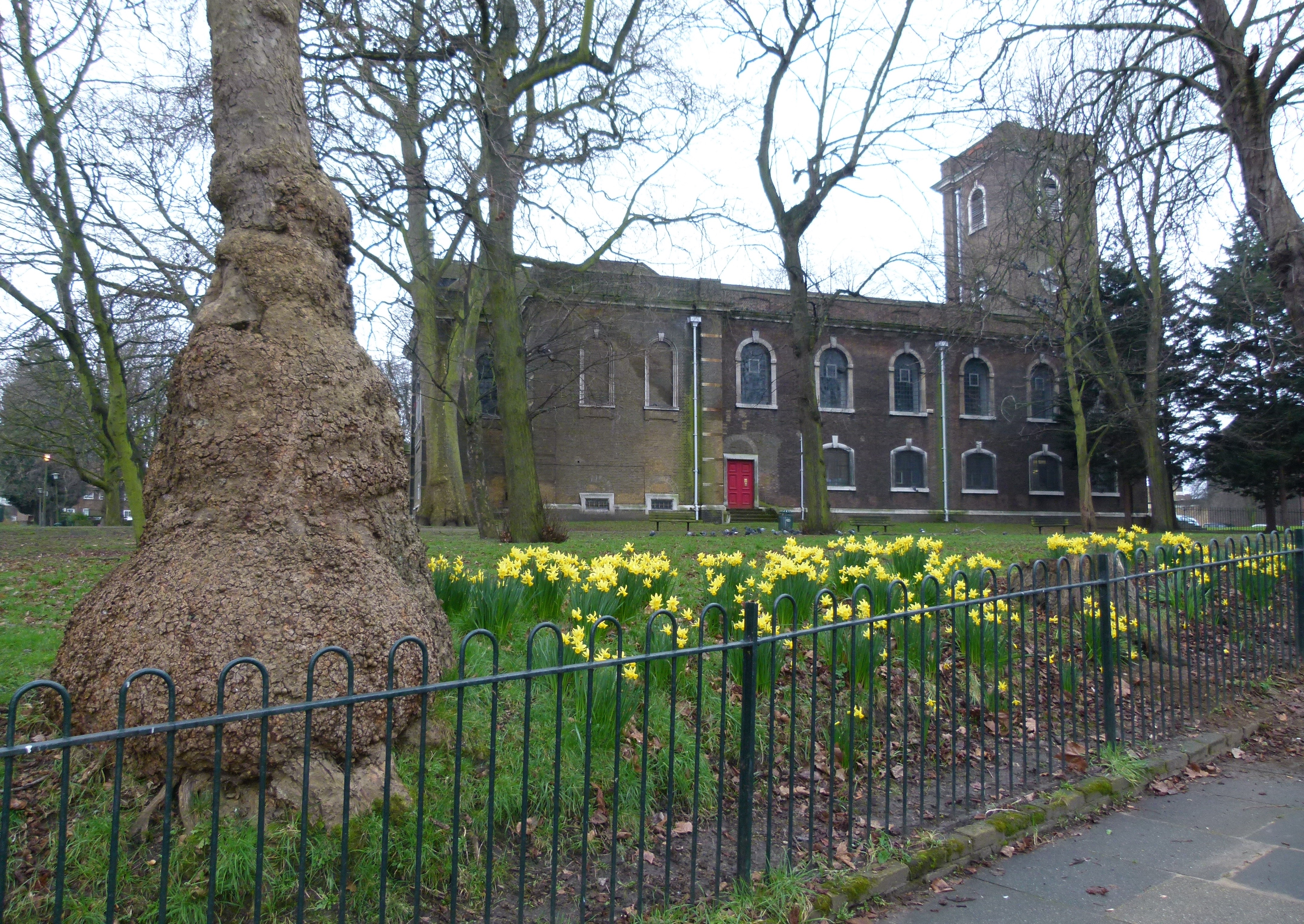
View from the northeast

=== Interior ===
The church consists of a five-bay nave flanked by colonnades (similar to St Nicholas, Deptford), two side aisles with galleries and some 19th-century additions: the chancel, the Lady Chapel to the south (containing the rare iron-cast tomb of Henry Maudslay, designed by himself) and the organ chamber to the north. The interior is painted pale blue and white, including the large red stone columns flanking the chancel and the small columns framing the east window. The royal coat of arms from 1740 once hung above the sanctuary but is now kept in the porch beneath the tower. The pipe organ was made by John Byfield in 1754 and was originally installed in the west gallery. After the building of the new chancel in 1894, the reredos of the old chancel (made of oak) were adjusted to be installed in the south chapel. Above is a stained glass window by Herbert Hendrie from 1922. A rail-mounted moveable pulpit (walnut, with inlays) was installed in 1899, funded by a public subscription on Queen Victoria's Diamond Jubilee.

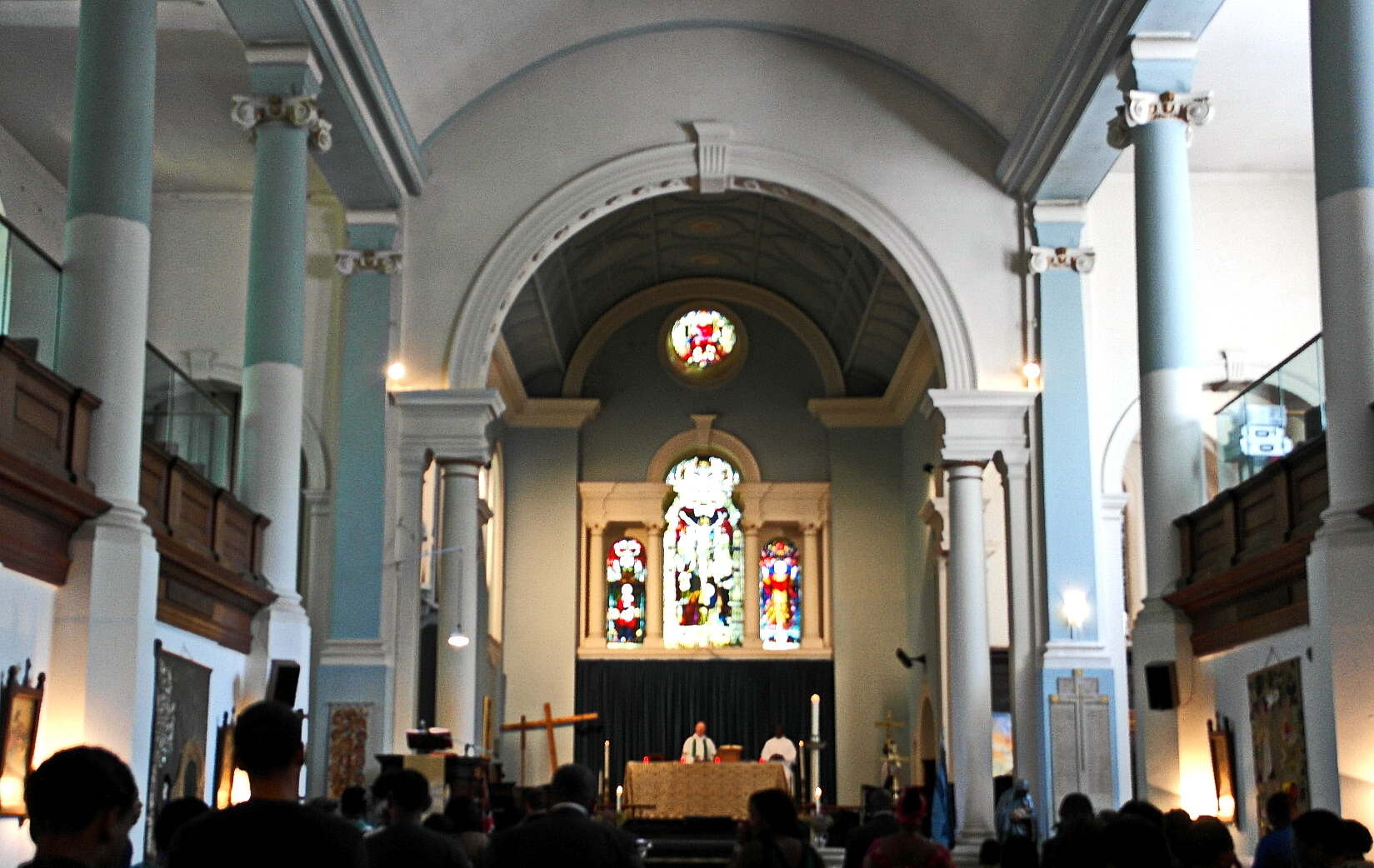
View towards the east

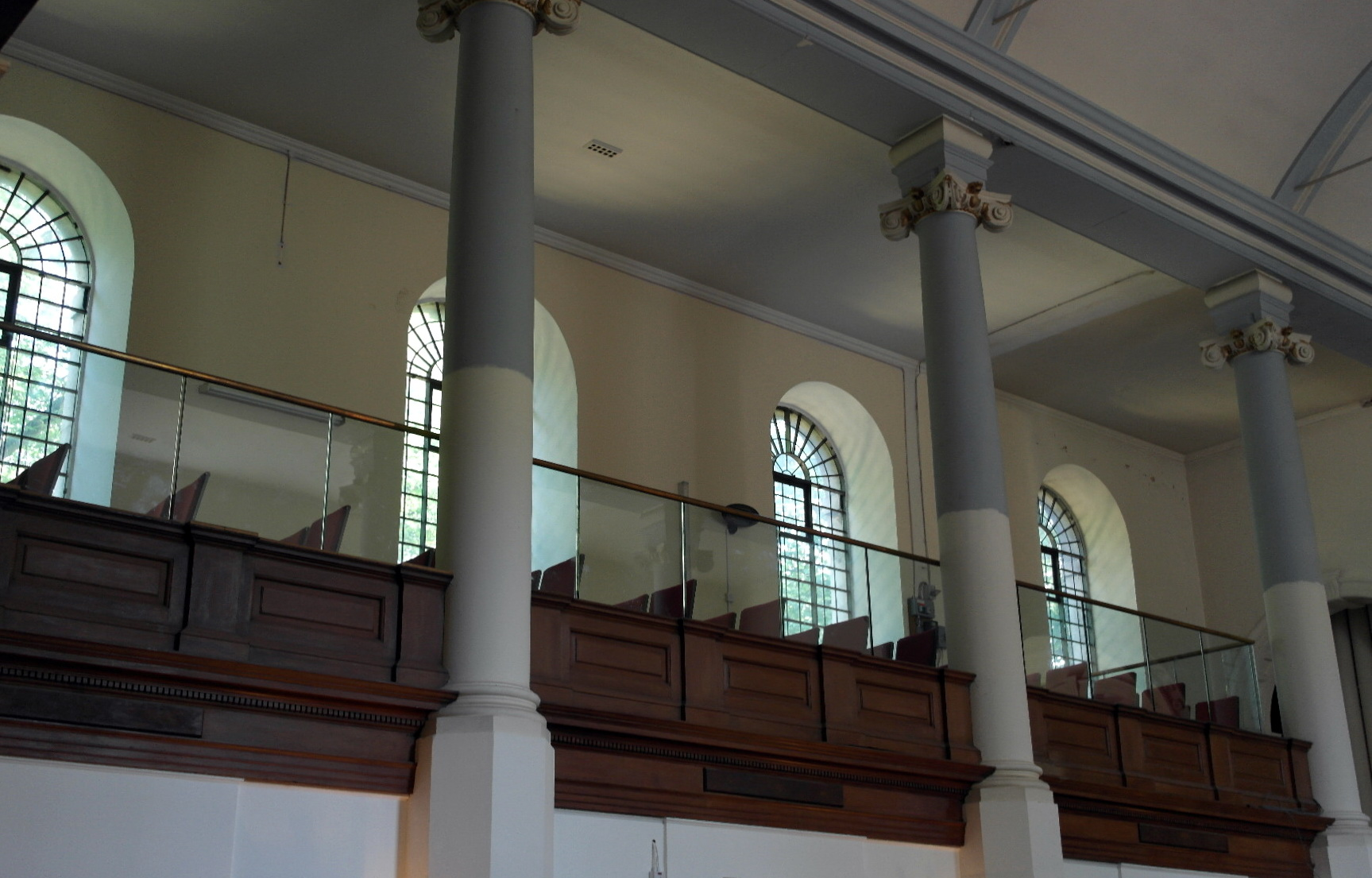
North gallery

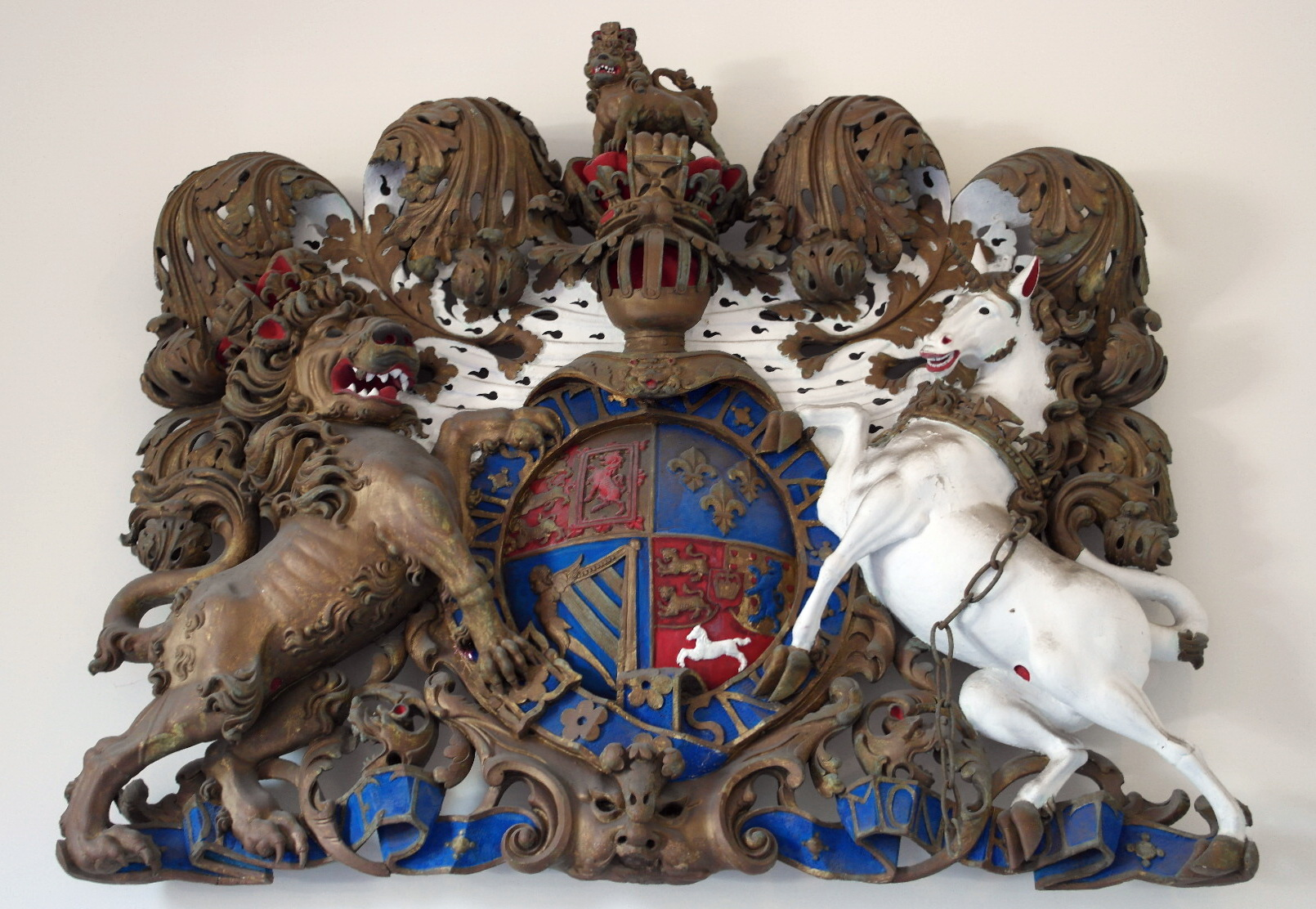
Royal coat of arms

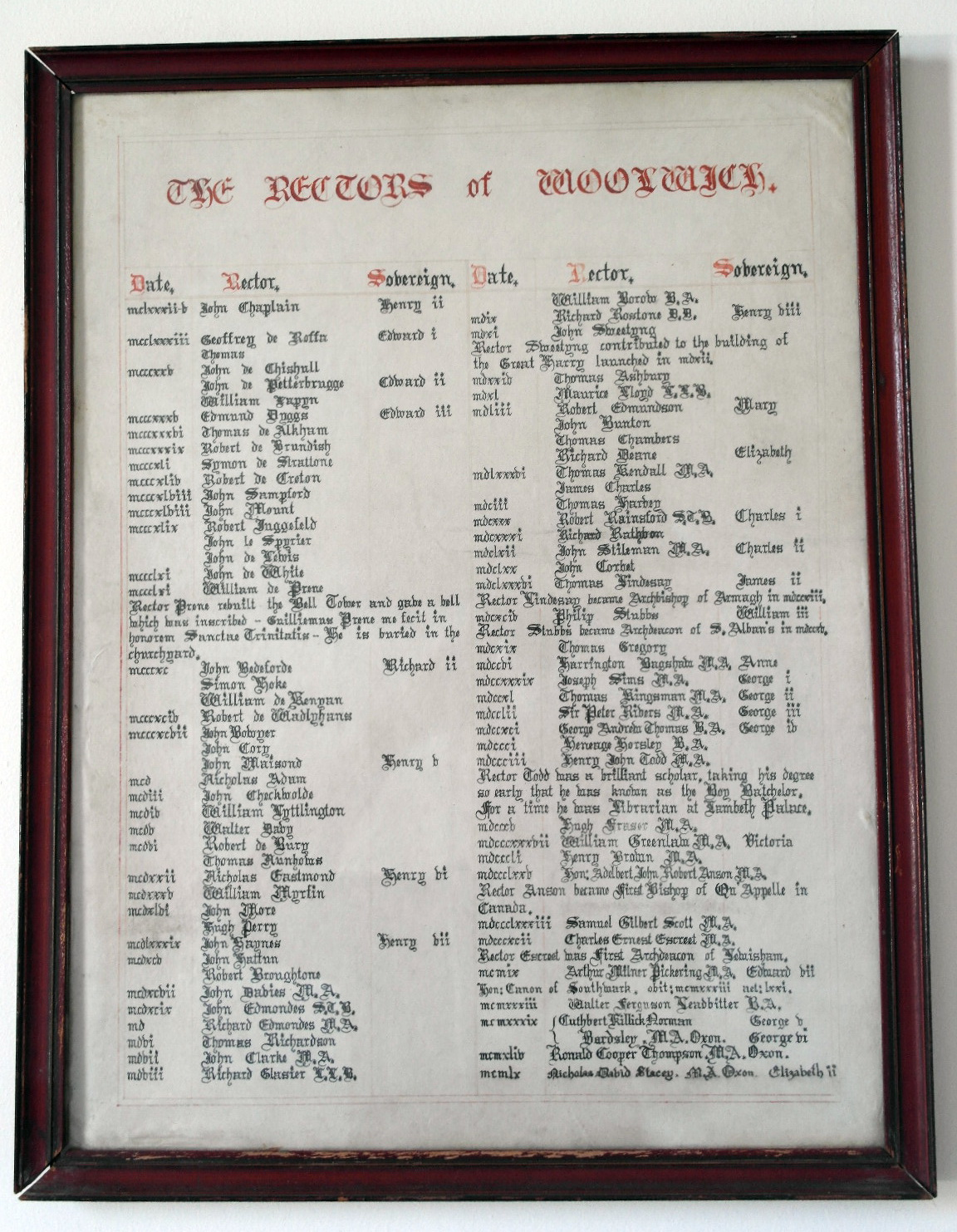
List of rectors

== St Mary's Garden ==
The churchyard is now a public park, Saint Mary's Garden, in the English landscape garden style. It was designed in 1893 by Fanny Wilkinson, Britain's first professional woman landscape gardener. Her design features gravel paths, lawns and mature trees. Some gravestones can still be seen along the northeastern border. Nearby stands the tomb of bare-knuckle boxer Tom Cribb who lived in Woolwich. It has the shape of a lamenting lion resting its paw on an urn. Stairs lead up to the park entrance from Woolwich Church Street. Other entrances are at Church Hill, St Mary Street and John Wilson Street. Two belvederes, one just outside the park, offer fine views of the river Thames and the Woolwich Ferry, although the view is threatened by several tall buildings going up along the river. In the early 1960s the park was enlarged and redesigned by G.P. Youngman who added new paths, raised beds and alpine rockeries. A drinking fountain and several tombs were removed, the foremost of which was that of Woolwich-born engineer Henry Maudslay.

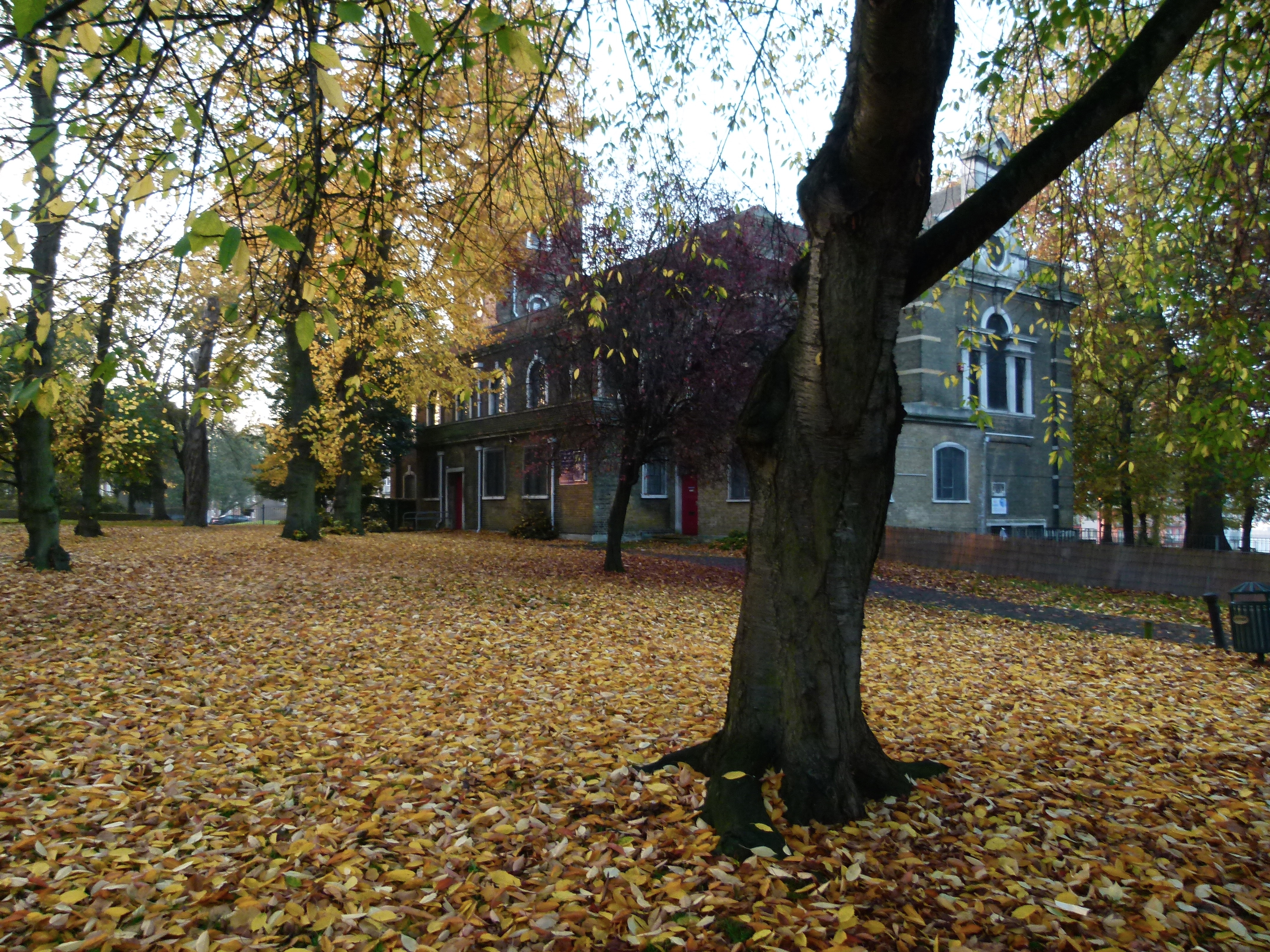
Autumnal view

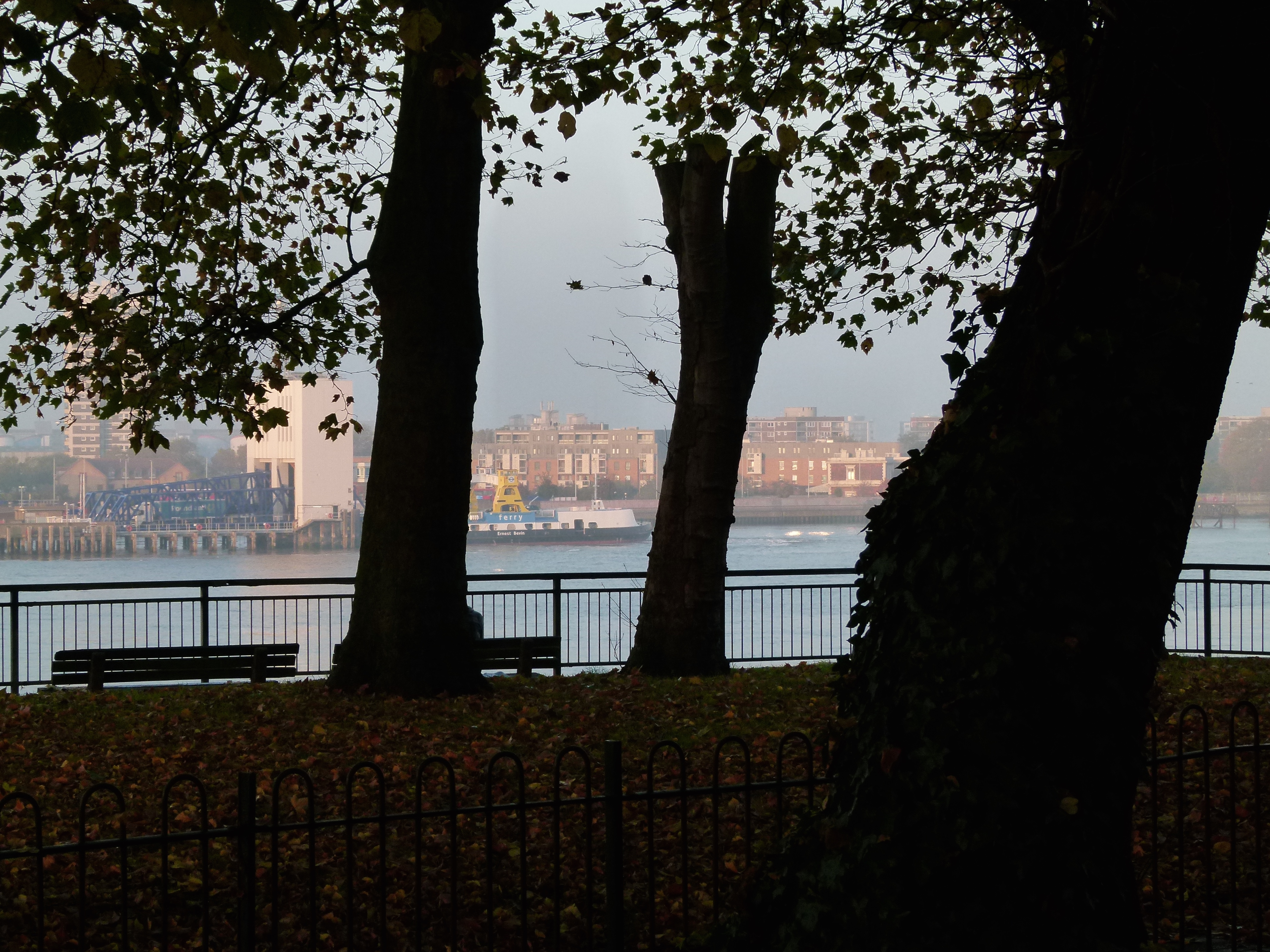
Belvedere and view

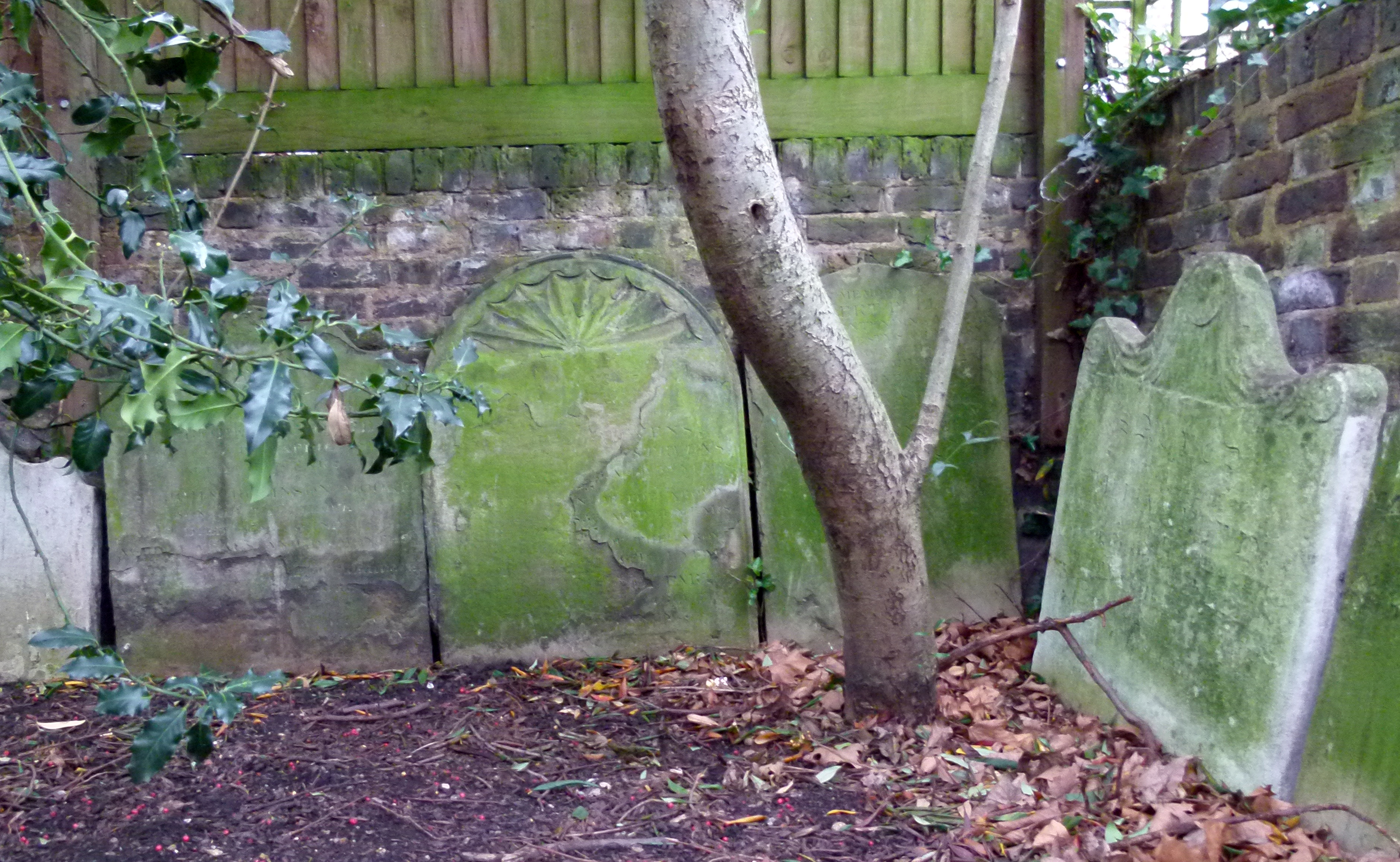
Gravestones

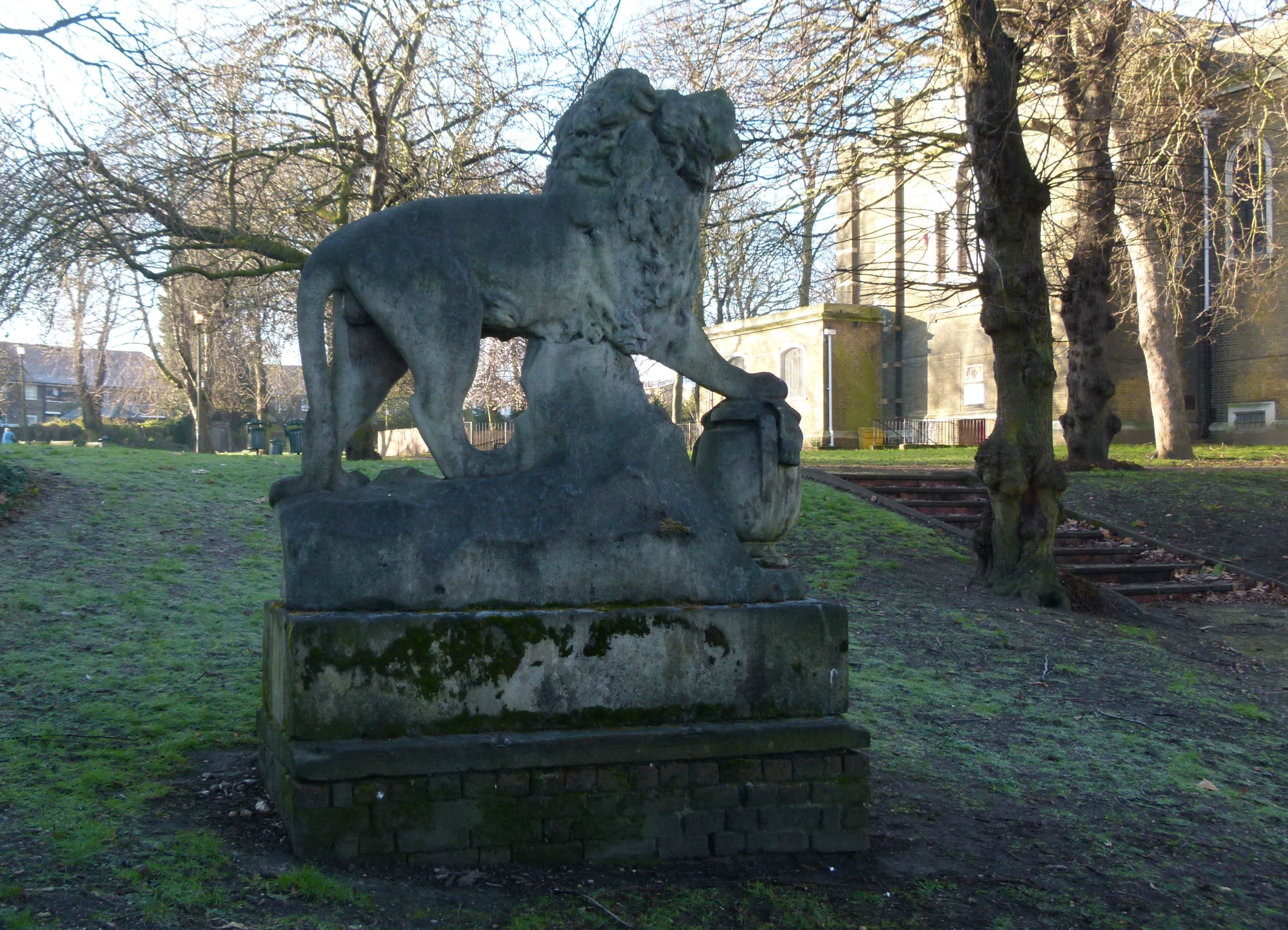
Tom Cribb's tomb

== See also ==
- Saint Mary Magdalene Church of England All Through School
