= St James Garlickhythe =

Coordinates: 51°30′39.99″N 0°5′37.54″W

- Church of Saint James the Great, Garlickhythe
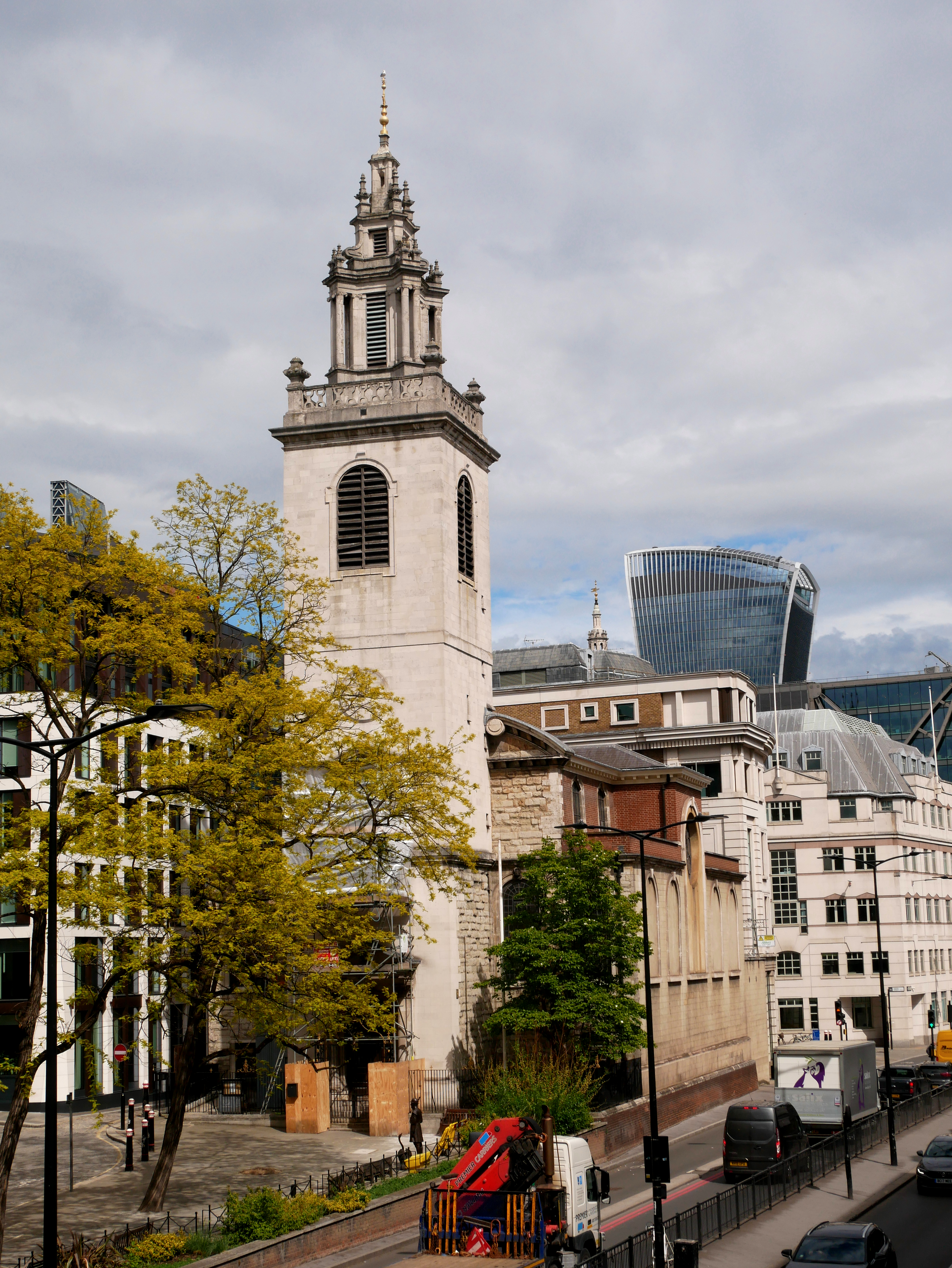
- St James Garlickhythe from the southwest

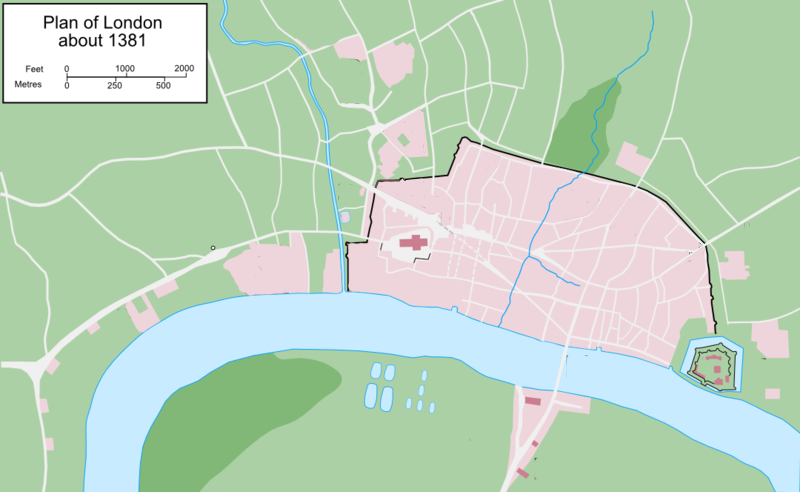
- Location within City of London Location within City of London in 1300
- OS grid reference: TQ 32384 80854
- Location: Garlick Hill, City of London, EC2
- Country: England
- Denomination: Church of England
- Previous denomination: Roman Catholic (to 1538)
- Churchmanship: Prayer Book Catholic
- Website: stjamesgarlickhythe.org

History
- Founded: 11th century
- Dedication: James the Great

Architecture
- Heritage designation: Grade I listed building
- Architect: Sir Christopher Wren
- Style: English Baroque

Administration
- Diocese: Diocese of London
- Parish: St James Garlickhythe

Clergy
- Bishop: The Rt Revd Jonathan Baker (AEO)
- Rector: The Revd Canon Anthony Howe MA FSA

St James Garlickhythe is a Church of England parish church in Vintry ward of the City of London, nicknamed "Wren's lantern" owing to its profusion of windows.

Recorded since the 12th century, the church was destroyed in the Great Fire of London in 1666 and rebuilt by the office of Sir Christopher Wren. It is also the official church of several City livery companies.

== History ==
The church is dedicated to the disciple James, son of Zebedee, known as 'the Great'. St. James Garlickhythe is a stop on a pilgrims' route ending at the cathedral of Santiago da Compostela. Visitors to the London church may have their credencial, or pilgrim passport, stamped with the impression of a scallop shell.

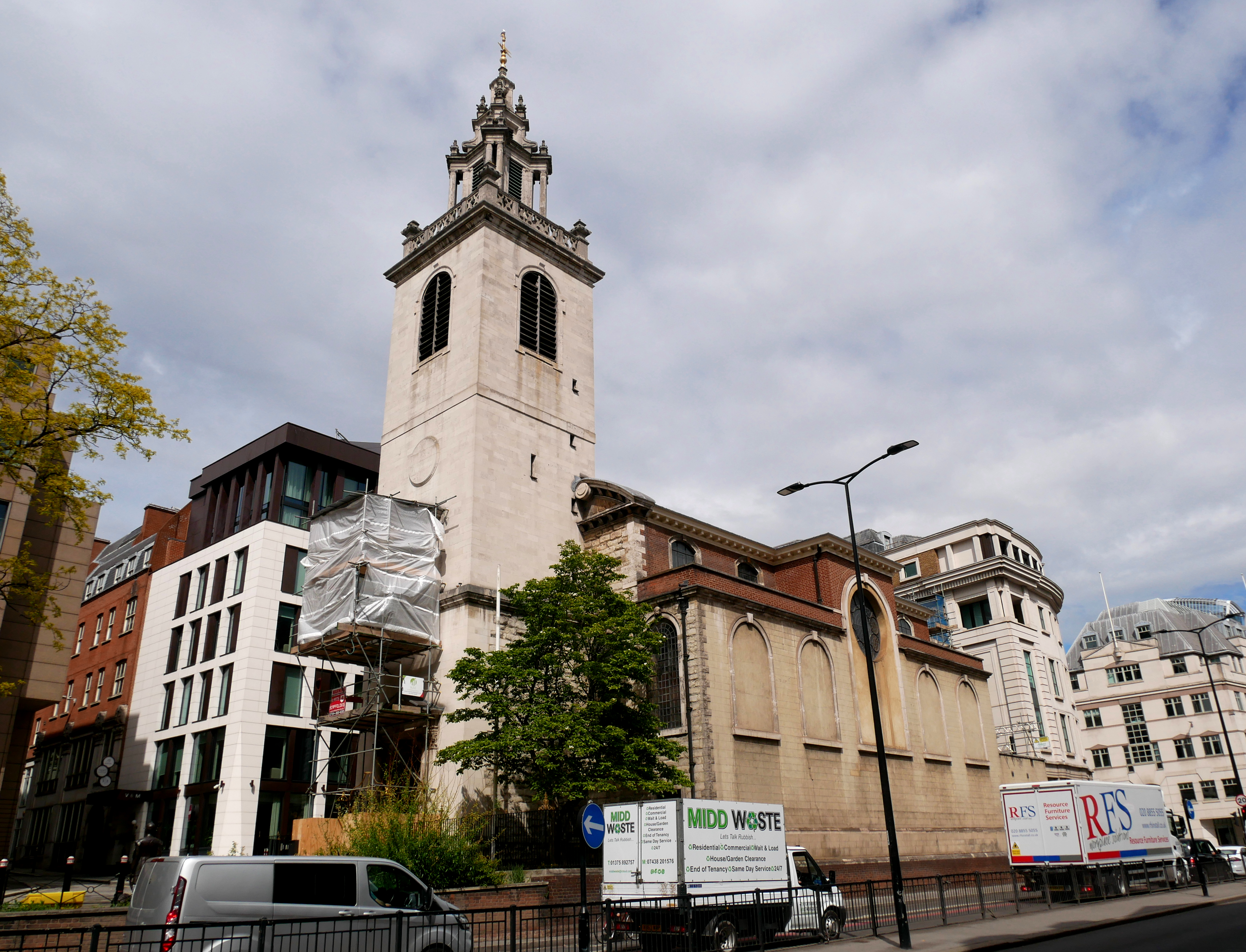
The church as seen from the southwest

'Garlickhythe' refers to the nearby landing place, or "hythe", near which garlic was sold in medieval times.

The earliest surviving reference to the church is as ecclesiam Sancti Jacobi in a 12th-century will. Other records of the church refer to it as St James in the Vintry, St James Comyns, St James-by-the-Thames and St James super Ripam (Latin: 'upon the river').

The ships from France loaded with garlic also carried wine and St James has a long association with wine merchants. The church is located in the City of London ward of Vintry, and in 1326 the Sheriff of London and vintner Richard de Rothing paid to have the church rebuilt. Another company with long associations with the church is the Joiners' Company, who trace their origins back to a religious guild founded in St James in 1375.

In the following century, the church became collegiate and was served by seven chantry priests. The eminence of St. James in the Middle Ages is reflected in its being the burial place of six Lord Mayors.

St. James became a parish church upon the dissolution of the monasteries under Henry VIII, although the church was not adversely affected – indeed it was a beneficiary of the demolition of church furnishings associated with the Roman Catholic rite. In 1560, the rood screen of the nearby St. Martin Vintry was dismantled and fashioned into pews for St. James. At the same time, the choir was provided with song books.

Another change introduced under Henry VIII was the order that all parishes in England were to maintain a weekly register of births, deaths and marriages. The oldest surviving registers are those of St. James, the first entry being the baptism of Edward Butler on 18 November 1535.

St. James was repaired and expanded several times during the first half of the 17th century – the north aisle being rebuilt in 1624 and a gallery added in 1644.

Under the Commonwealth, the parishioners provided a pension for the rector after he was ousted, in 1647, for using the banned Book of Common Prayer.

All was lost in the Great Fire. Rebuilding began a decade later, as recorded on the Victorian vestry boards prominent in the church porch;

"The foundation thereof were laid AD 1676 – John Hinde and John Hoyle, Church Wardens. It was rebuilt and re-opened 1682 and completely finished AD 1683...". The body of the church may have been finished, but the tower lacked a steeple.

Recorded in the church's accounts for 1682 are the items

1. Two bottles of sherry and pipes [wine containers] at the opening of the church 3.4
2. Hire of 3 dozen cushions and porterage 13.4
3. Wine when the Lord Mayor and Aldermen were at our church 1.11.0
4. Wax links to enlighten my Lord Mayor home 4.6

and a payment of 40s each to Wren's two clerks "for their care and kindness in hastening the building of the church, and to induce them to do the like for the more speedy finishing of the Steeple."

This inducement had no effect. Building on the tower began 33 years later and was finished in 1717 by Nicholas Hawksmoor. The tower was built by Edward Strong the Younger a friend of Christopher Wren the Younger. The total cost of the church and tower was £7230.

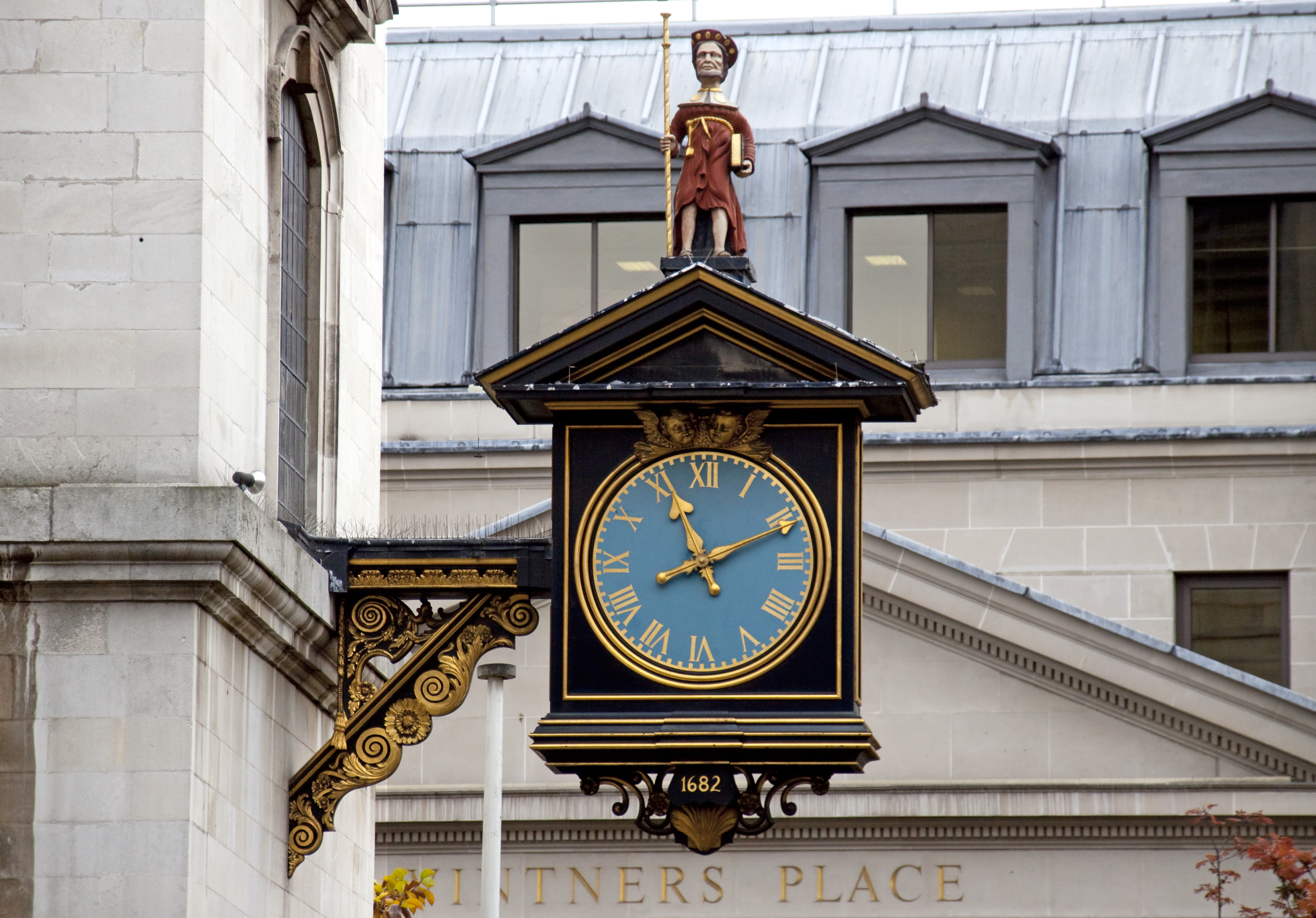
1988 replica of 1682 clock

On 12 August 1711 Richard Steele attended a Sunday service led by the Rector Philip Stubbs at St. James, and published the ensuing reflections in Issue 147 of The Spectator. He compares the moving delivery of the rector with a number of stereotypes – the quiet talker, the negligent reader, the fast talker and the bombast, then goes on to criticise the ranting of Presbyterians and Dissenters. Unfortunately, his account includes no description of the congregation or of the church itself.

One month after this sermon, the future composer and Master of the King’s Musick, William Boyce, was baptised in St. James Garlickhythe.

The second half of the 19th century saw a movement of population from the City of London to suburbs in Middlesex, Kent, Essex and Surrey. This left many of the city churches with tiny congregations. In 1860, Charles Dickens attended a Sunday service at St. James Garlickhythe which he describes in The Uncommercial Traveller. The congregation had dwindled to twenty, the building was pervaded with damp and dust, which Dickens uses to convey an impression of the presence of dead parishioners.

The Union of Benefices Act 1860 was passed by Parliament, permitting the demolition of City churches and the sale of land to build churches in the suburbs. While several nearby churches – some of architectural eminence – were destroyed under the Union of Benefices Act, St. James was spared, perhaps due to its links to the guilds.

During World War I, a bomb dropped by a Zeppelin missed the church. In thanksgiving, the church introduced an annual Bomb Sermon.

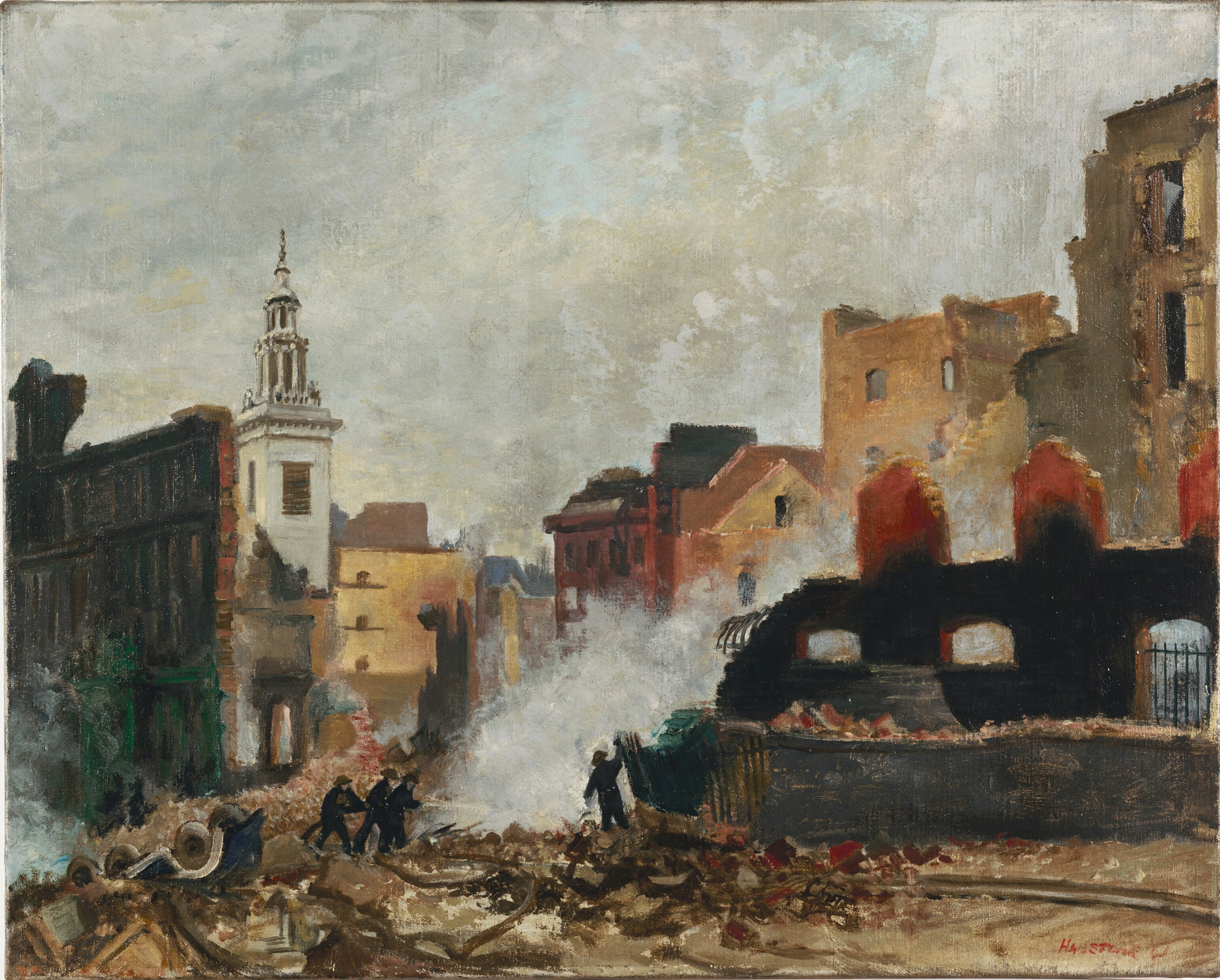
A painting of the church's steeple in April 1941, overlooking smoldering rubble during the Blitz

In May 1941, during the London Blitz a 500-pound (230 kg) German high explosive bomb crashed through the roof of St. James and buried itself below the floor in the south aisle. It did not explode, but was removed to Hackney Marshes and detonated. The buildings surrounding St. James were destroyed by incendiary bombs and this caused much external damage to the church, including the destruction of its clock. While this damage was being repaired in 1953, it was found that the woodwork was infested with the death watch beetle. This caused the church to be closed until 1963, while it was being restored by D. Lockhart-Smith and Alexander Gale. The result was said by Sir John Betjeman to be the best restoration of a City church.

In 1991, during construction of Vintners Hall across Upper Thames Street, a crane collapsed and the jib buried itself in the south wall. This caused the church to be closed again while the south face was rebuilt and some of the furnishings replaced.

=== Present day ===
The official dedication is The Parish Church of St James Garlickhythe with St Michael Queenhythe and Holy Trinity the Less. The parish stretches from Gardners Lane in the west to Angel Passage in the east. Its southern border is the River Thames, and to the north it snakes through the lanes south of Cannon Street.

The area now covers seven pre-Fire parishes: St James Garlickhythe, St Michael Queenhythe, Holy Trinity the Less, St Michael Paternoster Royal, St Martin Vintry, All Hallows the Great, and All Hallows the Less.

It is also responsible for services at the nearby St Michael Paternoster Royal, which lies within the parish boundary.

Sunday and daily services are drawn from the 1662 Book of Common Prayer. It is the church for more than a dozen livery companies (Clockmakers, Coachmakers, Dyers, Educators, Fanmakers, Glass Sellers, Gold and Silver Wyre Drawers, Horners, Joiners and Ceilers, Needlemakers, Painter-Stainers, Parish Clerks, Skinners, Vintners, and Weavers), as well as being the church of the Intelligence Corps.

The parish has passed resolutions A and B of the Priests (Ordination of Women) Measure 1993; this means that female priests and bishops are not permitted to officiate in the church. It receives alternative episcopal oversight from the Bishop of Fulham (currently Jonathan Baker).

== Building ==
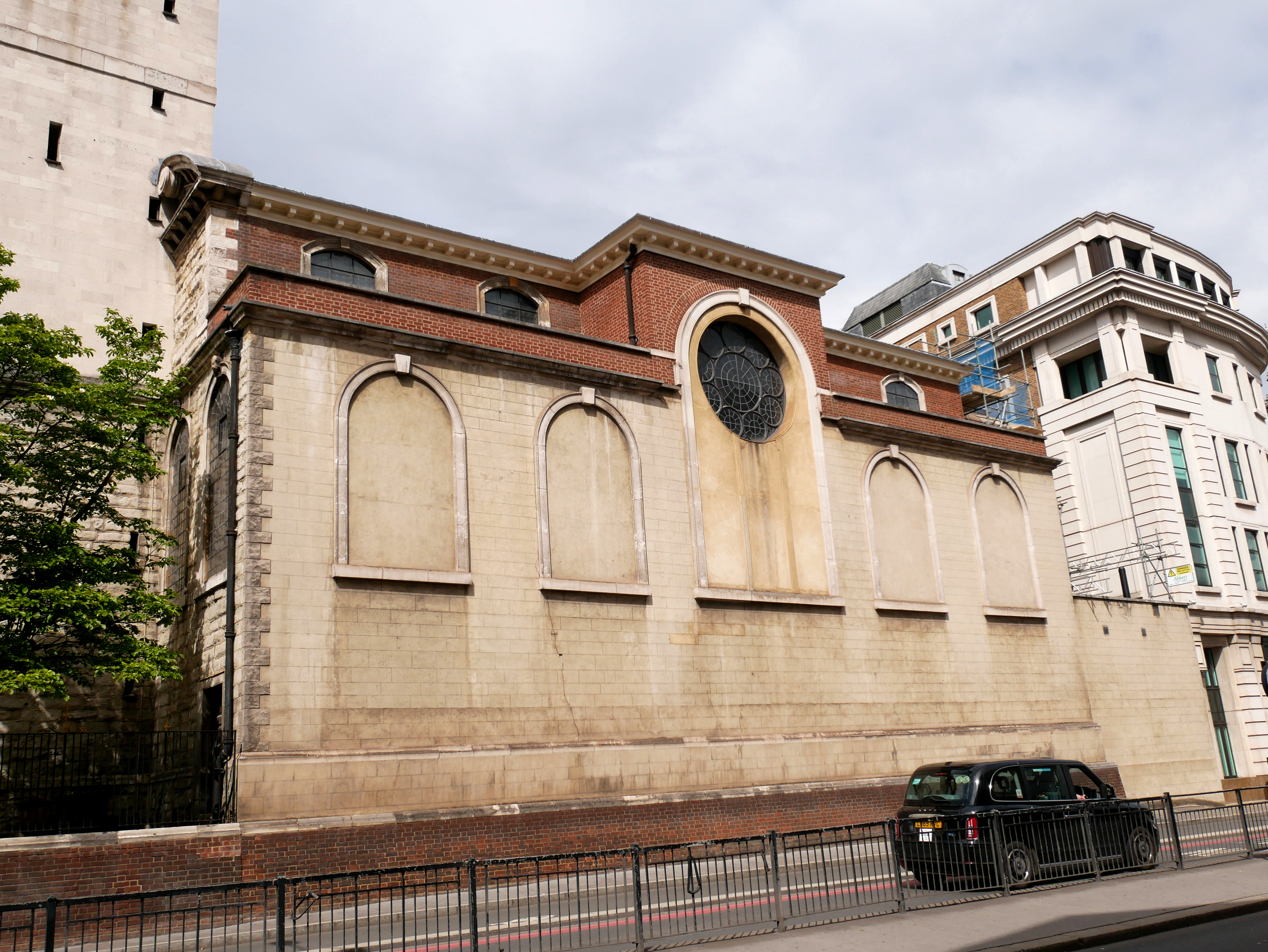
The south face of St. James Garlickhythe

St James Garlickhythe is in the shape of a rectangle, with the tower adjacent to the West and a protruding chancel (uniquely for a Wren church) projecting from the East. It is built from brick and Kentish ragstone, partly stuccoed, partly faced (since World War II) with Portland stone. Entrance is through a pedimented doorway with a cherub keystone in the tower, which is flanked by pairs of round headed windows in the west wall. Above is a recessed clerestory wall joined to the tower by semi-rounded pediments.

The south front, facing Upper Thames Street, was formerly built against, and it has only become the main façade since 1971. It is five bays long, with blind round headed windows, the one in the centre being much larger. Above the four outer windows are round clerestory windows. These additions were only made in 1981. The north front is similar, although the windows are real.

The 125 ft (38 m) tower was originally stuccoed. The plaster was removed in 1897 and old photographs of the church show the undressed wall. It was faced with Portland stone after World War II. The clock on the West face, with the image of St James, is a 1988 replica of a 1682 original. The figure of St James originally stood between two urns. The tower is plain, with round headed belfry windows, until the spire. At the top is a parapet with stirrup shaped piercings and squat urns on the corners. The stone spire was designed by Nicholas Hawksmoor and is similar to those of St Stephen Walbrook, St. Michael Paternoster Royal and, to a lesser extent, the west towers of St. Paul's Cathedral. It has three levels. The lowest is square, with a contraption of two columns standing in front of two pilasters protruding from each corner on top of which is an entablature and tiny urns. This is linked to the next stage by corner volutes, with a smaller square stage with more urns, and at the top is a tiny concave stage. The whole is capped with a flag finial.

Sacheverell Sitwell stated the spire suggested the grinding out of bell music by turning, as in a hurdy-gurdy. The vine leaf and grape motif gates to the west were a gift from the Vintners' Company.

The church was designated a Grade I listed building on 4 January 1950.

== Interior ==
The church interior is, at 40 feet (12 m), the highest of any Wren church. As it was originally surrounded by other buildings, Wren created tall main windows, as well as clerestory windows. The largest window of all was in the east, filling the arched alcove. Early in the 19th century, this was found to be weakening the wall and so was filled in. In 1815, the painting of the Ascension by Andrew Geddes was installed above the reredos in the place previously occupied by the window.

When built, the main entrance was in the middle of the north wall. This, too, has now been filled in. The church has a nave and two narrow aisles and is of five bays. There are two rows of five Ionic columns and two semi-columns, running from west to east. The columns support an entablature, which is broken in the middle and turned to the outside walls, effectively forming transepts. The columns are evenly spaced, except for those in the middle. With the original round-headed windows in the centre (now replaced by round windows), this would have given St. James a strong north–south axis. The cross-axial design was a conceit also used by Wren in St Magnus the Martyr and St Martin Ludgate. Subsequent rearrangement has made this less apparent.

The church was much renovated by the Victorians, most significantly by Basil Champneys in 1866. Their legacy, including stained glass windows, has been removed in the post-World War II renovation.

The chancel to the east is flanked by pilasters, and is slightly narrower than the nave, the ratio of the width being 1/3 chancel and 1/6 each for the aisles. Unlike the rest of the church, which has a flat ceiling, it has a barrel vault.

To the west is a gallery, erected in 1714 and supported by iron columns. It supports the original organ case of 1719 by Father Smith, decorated with trumpeting cherubs and palm trees. It is surmounted by a scallop shell.

The crystal chandelier, a gift from the Glass Sellers' Company, is a replica of that destroyed by the crashing crane in 1991 and is based on an 18th-century original hanging in Wren's Emmanuel College, Cambridge.

The reredos is original, with Corinthian columns flanking a Decalogue and supporting an entablature. The pediment was removed in 1815 to accommodate the painting. Also original are the communion table, with doves carved on the legs, the communion rail, and the churchwardens' pews with iron hat stands. The font was made by the church's mason, Christopher Kempster, and has an ogee cover. The joiners for the original furnishings were Fuller and Cleer, and the carver William Newman.

In 1876, the parish was combined with that of St Michael Queenhithe – a nearby Wren church, and St James received much of the furnishings. From St Michael's are the pulpit, with a tester and twisted balusters, as well as a wig peg for the preacher. A royal coat of arms of the House of Stuart on the south wall and a sword rest also come from St Michael's, as do two grand doorways, now used as screens. In addition, the church's own royal arms (which is of the House of Hanover) is on display on the north wall, almost opposite the other royal arms – making St James Garlickhythe the only City church with two reliefs of the royal arms.

No longer on display is a well-preserved mummy of a man known as "Jimmy Garlick". His embalmed body was discovered in the vaults in 1855. Analysis by the British Museum at one time had postulated that he was an adolescent who died at the turn of the 18th century. The body used to be on display in a glass cabinet, but has been closed to public view. In 2004, Jimmy Garlick featured in the Discovery Channel documentary series Mummy Autopsy, which used modern analytical techniques including carbon dating and x-ray analysis, establishing that he died between 1641 and 1801 and that he suffered from osteoarthritis, a disease that afflicts older people. Physical examination by the Discovery team showed that the mummy appeared to be balding and suffered tooth decay at the time of death, both consistent with an older person. The body is now interred in a sarcophagus in the only remaining part of the church crypt, and so is no longer open for public viewing.

== Bells ==
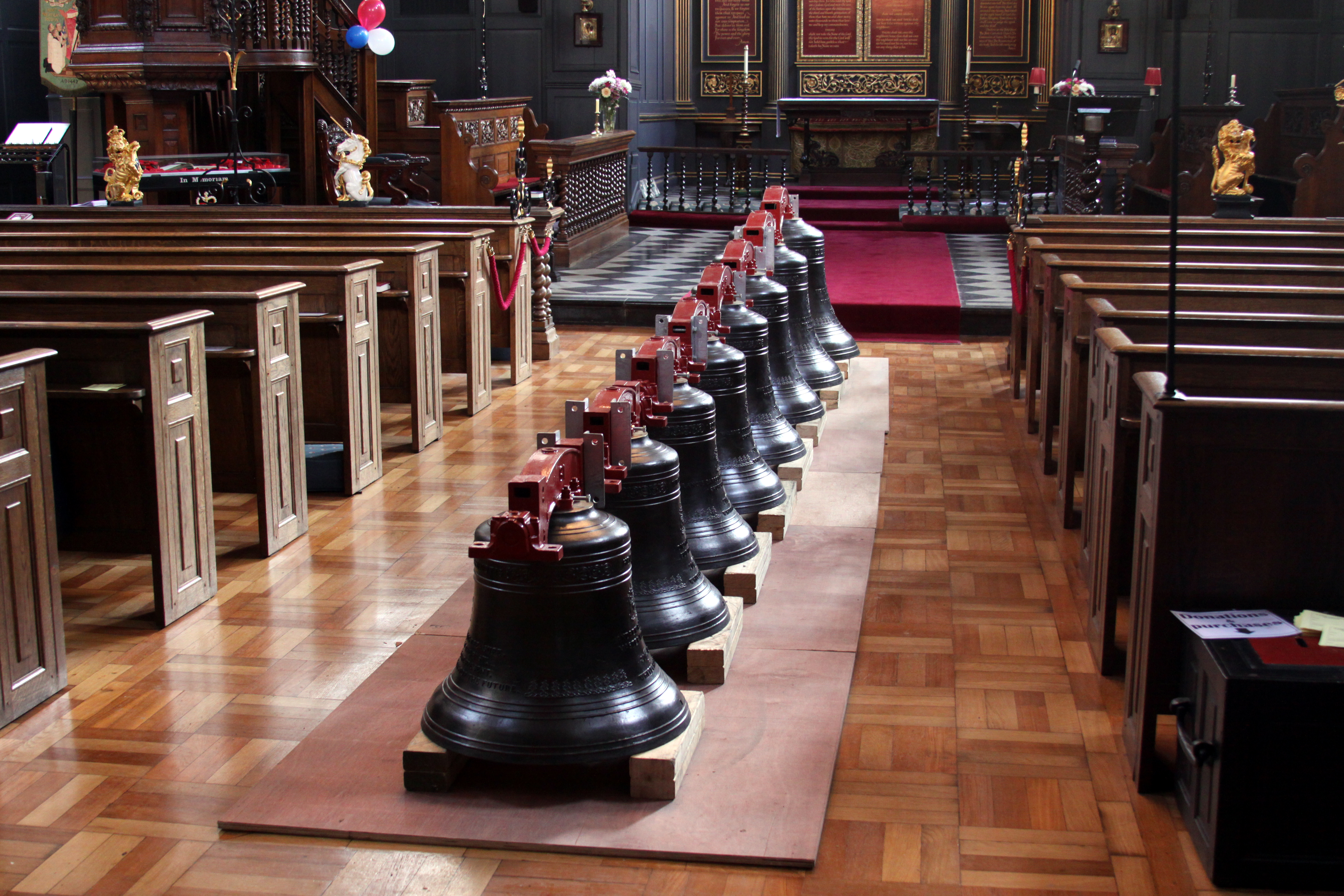
The Royal Jubilee Bells arranged down the aisle of St James Garlickhythe

A new ring of eight bells, which were granted the title "The Royal Jubilee Bells", was cast by the Whitechapel Bell Foundry on 3 June 2012. They were temporarily installed on a barge and rung on the River Thames during the Thames Diamond Jubilee Pageant, part of the Diamond Jubilee of Elizabeth II, and have since been installed permanently in the tower of the church.

== Burials ==
- Richard Platt, brewer and alderman, 1600
- George Stanley, 9th Baron Strange

== See also ==
- List of churches and cathedrals of London
- List of Christopher Wren churches in London
