= Blackheath Bluecoat Church of England School =

Location
- Old Dover Road; Blackheath, London, SE3 8SY; England; 51.477°N 0.028°E

Information
- Type: Voluntary aided school
- Religious affiliation: Church of England
- Established: 1700
- Closed: 2014
- Local authority: Greenwich
- Department for Education URN: 100195 Tables
- Ofsted: Reports
- Gender: Coeducational
- Age: 11 to 18
- Website: http://www.bbcs.greenwich.sch.uk/

Blackheath Bluecoat Church of England School was a secondary school and sixth form located in the Blackheath Standard area of Blackheath, in the Royal Borough of Greenwich. Its closure was announced in January 2012 and the school formally closed at the end of August 2014.

== History ==
The Greenwich Blue Coat Girls' School in Greenwich was founded in 1700 by "several charitable ladies of this town". It is also mentioned by Dorothy George in her book about London life in the 18th Century. One of these ladies was Mrs Margaret Flamsteed, wife of the first Astronomer Royal, John Flamsteed, who was appointed by King Charles II in 1675. The school began with 30 poor girls who were taken in for four years to be trained in household matters as well as reading, writing and the church catechism. The girls were found positions in service in local houses.

The school rented a building in London Street (later Greenwich High Road) and was closely associated with the Parish Church of St Alfege. It moved to Lime Kiln Lane (later South Street) in 1756 and then in 1825 to a site at the top of Royal Hill, later Point Hill, Greenwich. The school remained there until 1959.

On the other side of Blackheath, the St John's Church of England National School was founded in 1854 as the first Church of England school in Blackheath for boys, girls and infants. The girls and infants were on a site in Russell Place (now Reynolds Place) and the boys in a local Mission Hall. In 1907 the London County Council withdrew its support from the Boys' School and an appeal was launched to build a new school. The result was the Blackheath and Kidbrooke National Church of England School, built on a site adjoining the old school in Old Dover Road. The school became a secondary mixed school.

In 1945 the London County Council felt that the Greenwich Girls' Blue Coat School, which by then was a technical school providing tuition in housecraft, catering and needlework to 60 girls aged 14–16, was too small. In 1959 the school amalgamated with the Blackheath and Kidbrooke School to form the Blackheath & Bluecoat School. The old buildings in Point Hill were used as an annexe until 1963 when extensions were completed on the Old Dover Road site. In 1965 the school became known as Blackheath Bluecoat School.

A scheme to expand the school came to fruition in 1972 when building began on land adjoining the school. The new school was fully comprehensive with a target role of 1050 pupils including Sixth Form.

The school was awarded specialist status in September 2008 and specialised in the learning and teaching of mathematics and computing.

=== Closure ===
In 2009 the school became part of a federation with Saint Cecilia's Church of England School in south-west London. However, in September 2011, it was announced that London Borough of Greenwich was considering closing the school and a public consultation process began to decide the school's fate. Closure was confirmed at a council meeting on 17 January 2012. Phased closure started from July 2012, with final closure of the school in August 2014.

The Old Dover Road buildings were later (2017–18) used to accommodate the secondary stage of Saint Mary Magdalene Church of England All Through School prior to its move to a new purpose-built school on Greenwich Peninsula. The school was then demolished and the site used for construction of another secondary school, Leigh Academy Blackheath.

== Notable former pupils ==
- Janice Atkinson, UK Independence Party MEP
- Duwayne Brooks, friend of Stephen Lawrence and politician
- Janet Daby, MP
- Paul Elliott, English footballer
- Rio Ferdinand, English footballer
- Stephen Lawrence, murder victim
