= Philip Stubbs (priest) =

Philip Stubbs (1665–1738) was an English churchman and author, the archdeacon of St Albans and a Fellow of the Royal Society. During his life, his sermons were published in pamphlet and book form. He was active in Christian missionary societies, and social work, founding several day schools.

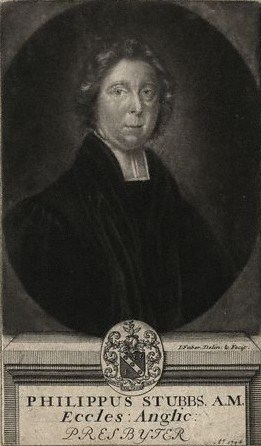
1708 mezzotint of Stubbs by John Faber the elder

== Life ==
He was son of Philip Stubbs, citizen and vintner of London, and was born on 2 October 1665, during the Great Plague of London, in the parish of St Andrew Undershaft. He was educated from 1678 to 1682 at Merchant Taylors' School, and went as a commoner to Wadham College, Oxford, on 23 March 1683. In the following year he was elected scholar of the college, graduated B.A. in 1686, M.A. in 1689, became fellow in 1691, and proceeded B.D. in 1722.

On taking holy orders he was appointed curate in the united parishes of St Benet Gracechurch and St Leonard Eastcheap. He was then chaplain successively to Robert Grove, bishop of Chichester, and to George Hastings, 8th Earl of Huntingdon. From 1694 to 1699 he was rector of St Mary Magdalene Woolwich in Kent (now London), and was chosen first chaplain of Greenwich Hospital, an office which he held until his death. On leaving Woolwich he was presented by the bishop of London to the rectory of St Alphage London Wall, to which was added in 1705 the parish of St James Garlickhithe.

Stubbs was elected F.R.S. on 30 November 1703, and was interested in literature and archæology. Richard Steele, present one Sunday in St James Garlickhithe when Stubbs was officiating, eulogised him in The Spectator. In 1715 Stubbs was preferred to the archdeaconry of St Albans, and four years later the bishop of London collated him to the rectory of Launton, Oxfordshire. He interested himself in the education of poorer children, and he was instrumental in founding day schools in the parishes of St Alphage and St James, as well as in Bicester, near Launton. He died there on 13 September 1738, and was buried in the old burial-ground of the hospital, his tombstone being preserved in the mausoleum.

== Works ==
Stubbs published separate sermons and addresses, as well as a collected volume of sermons in 1704 (8vo). His sermon, ‘God's Dominion over the Seas and the Seaman's Duty,’ preached at Longreach on board the Royal Sovereign, reached a third edition; it was also translated into French and distributed among the French seamen who were prisoners at the time. He was one of the earliest promoters of the Society for the Propagation of the Gospel in Foreign Parts, and drew up the first report of its proceedings in 1703. He was then selected to preach a sermon in St Paul's Cathedral on Trinity Sunday in 1711. The Queen had appointed the day for a collection for the society in the city. Stubbs sermon, ‘The Divine Mission of Gospel Ministers,’ was also later published. Finally, Stubbs took an active part in the development of the Society for Promoting Christian Knowledge.

== Family ==
Stubbs married Mary Willis, daughter of John Willis, rector of West Horndon, Essex, in 1696. The couple had two surviving sons and one daughter. Mary survived her husband by twenty-one years, during which she lived in the Bromley College for clergymen's widows. She died in 1759 at the age of 95.

The archdeacon's only sister, Elizabeth, married Ambrose Bonwicke, the elder, a nonjuror, and headmaster of Merchant Taylors' School.
