= Worshipful Company of Joiners and Ceilers =

Livery company of the City of London

The Worshipful Company of Joiners and Ceilers is one of the livery companies in the City of London. The Guild of St James Garlickhythe, a religious guild that was the company's predecessor, named after the church where it was founded, was formed in 1375. The organisation of wood craftsmen, who were known at various times as fusters, carvers, and joiners, received a Royal Charter of incorporation in 1571. The craft of 'ceiling' refers to the application and installation of both wall and ceiling wood panelling.

The company has traditionally been separate from the Worshipful Company of Carpenters, for historically Joiners attached wood using glue or other similar materials including pins and dowels, while carpenters used nails or pegs. After many years of not fully supporting their original craft ideals, the company is now pursuing a closer link with the training of apprentices both in the craft of Joinery and Ceiling (and carving), It also supports craft-related training institutions, as well as general educational establishments and selected units of the UK armed services.

The company ranks 41st in the order of precedence of the livery companies. Its motto, embraced by John Wilkes, Master of the company in 1770, is "Join Loyalty And Liberty". The motto prior to formal College of Arms recognition in 1993 was "God Grant Us to Use Justice with Mercy".

As of 2024, the company is still operating and functions as a non-profit.

== Arms ==
Coat of arms of Worshipful Company of Joiners and Ceilers
Crest On a wreath Or and azure, A demi savage proper, wreathed about the head and waist with leaves vert, holding in the dexter hand over the shoulder a tilting spear Or, headed argent. Mantled gules, doubled argent Escutcheon Gules, a chevron argent between in chief two pairs of compasses extended at the points and in base a sphere Or; on a chief of the second a pale azure between two roses of the field, barbed and seeded proper, the pale charged with an escallop also of the second. Motto Join loyalty with liberty.
