= Saint Mary Magdalene Church of England All Through School =

Location
- Kingsman Street; Greenwich Borough; London, SE18 5PW; England
- Coordinates: 51.49159°N 0.061349°E

Information
- Type: Voluntary aided school
- Religious affiliation: Church of England
- Local authority: Greenwich
- Department for Education URN: 100171 Tables
- Ofsted: Reports
- Co-Executive Headteachers: Claire Harrison; Victoria Wainwright
- Gender: Co-educational
- Age: 3 to 18
- Website: www.koinoniafederation.com

Saint Mary Magdalene Church of England All Through School is a co-educational Church of England all-through school and sixth form located over two sites in the London Borough of Greenwich, England. The school is named after St Mary Magdalene Church.

The original primary school site on Kingsman Street in Woolwich was established in the Victorian era, connected to the nearby St Mary Magdalene Church. In 2016 plans were approved for the school to expand to include a secondary school department and sixth form. The secondary school was temporarily accommodated at a site in Blackheath (the former Blackheath Bluecoat school in Old Dover Road) until relocating to a new campus on Hendon Street on the Greenwich Peninsula in 2019. Today the school is based over two sites (Kingsman Street and Peninsula) and is administered by the Greenwich London Borough Council and the Anglican Diocese of Southwark. The school is also part of the Koinonia Federation which includes Christ Church Primary School in Greenwich.

Saint Mary Magdalene Church of England All Through School offers GCSEs and BTECs as programmes of study for pupils, while students in the sixth form have the option to study from a range of A Levels and further BTECs.

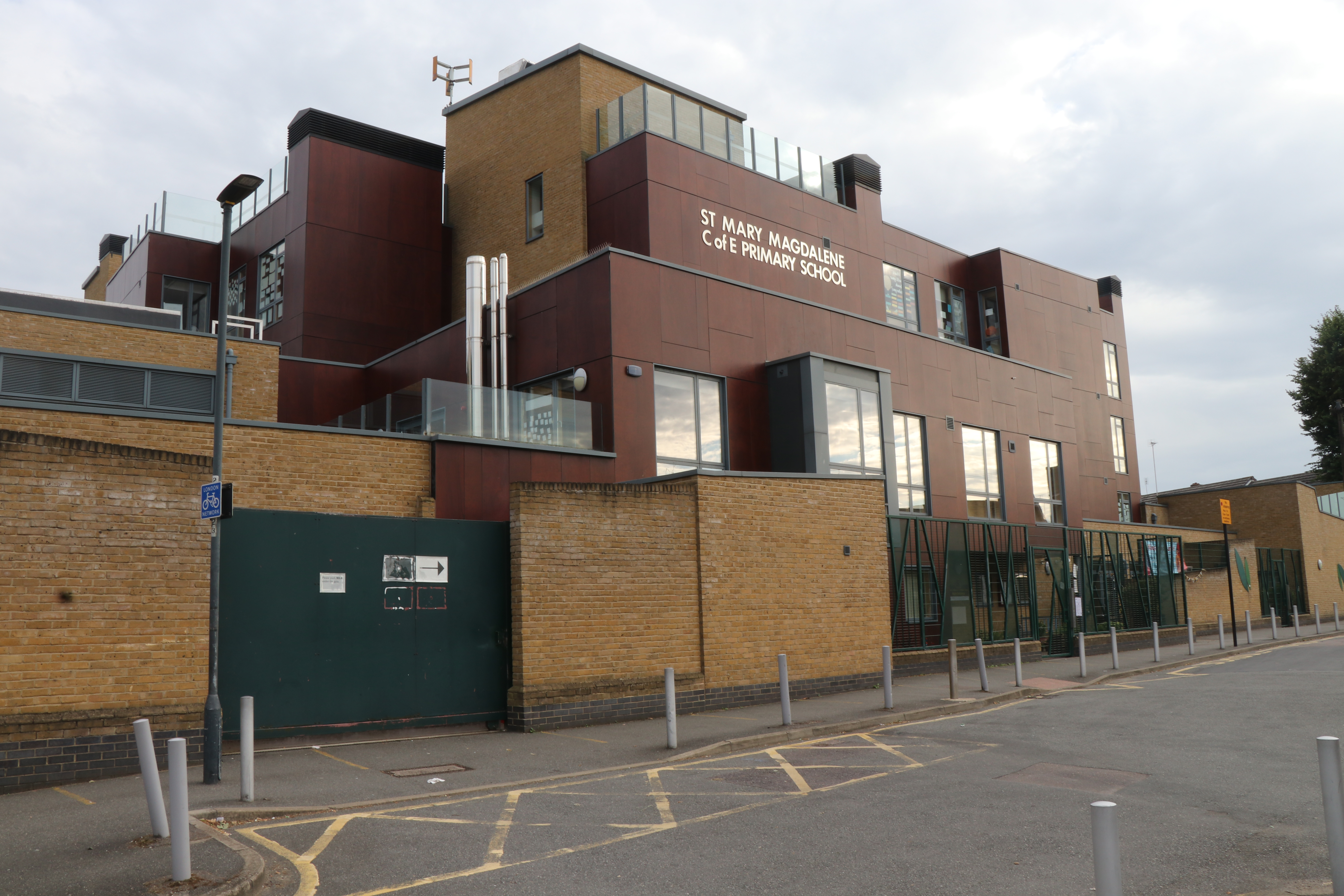
St Mary Magdalene CofE Primary School, Woolwich

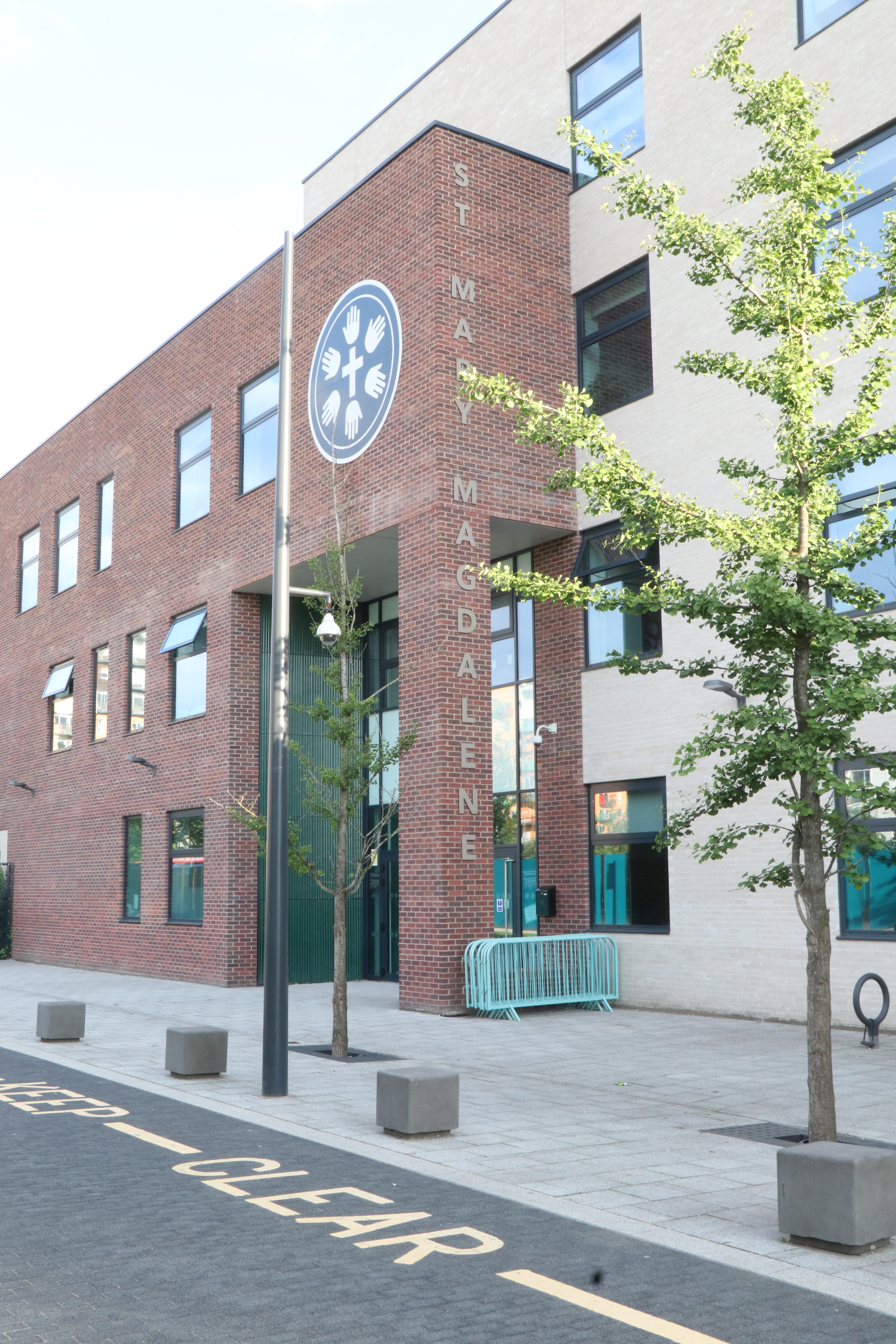
St Mary Magdalene All Through School - Greenwich Peninsula site

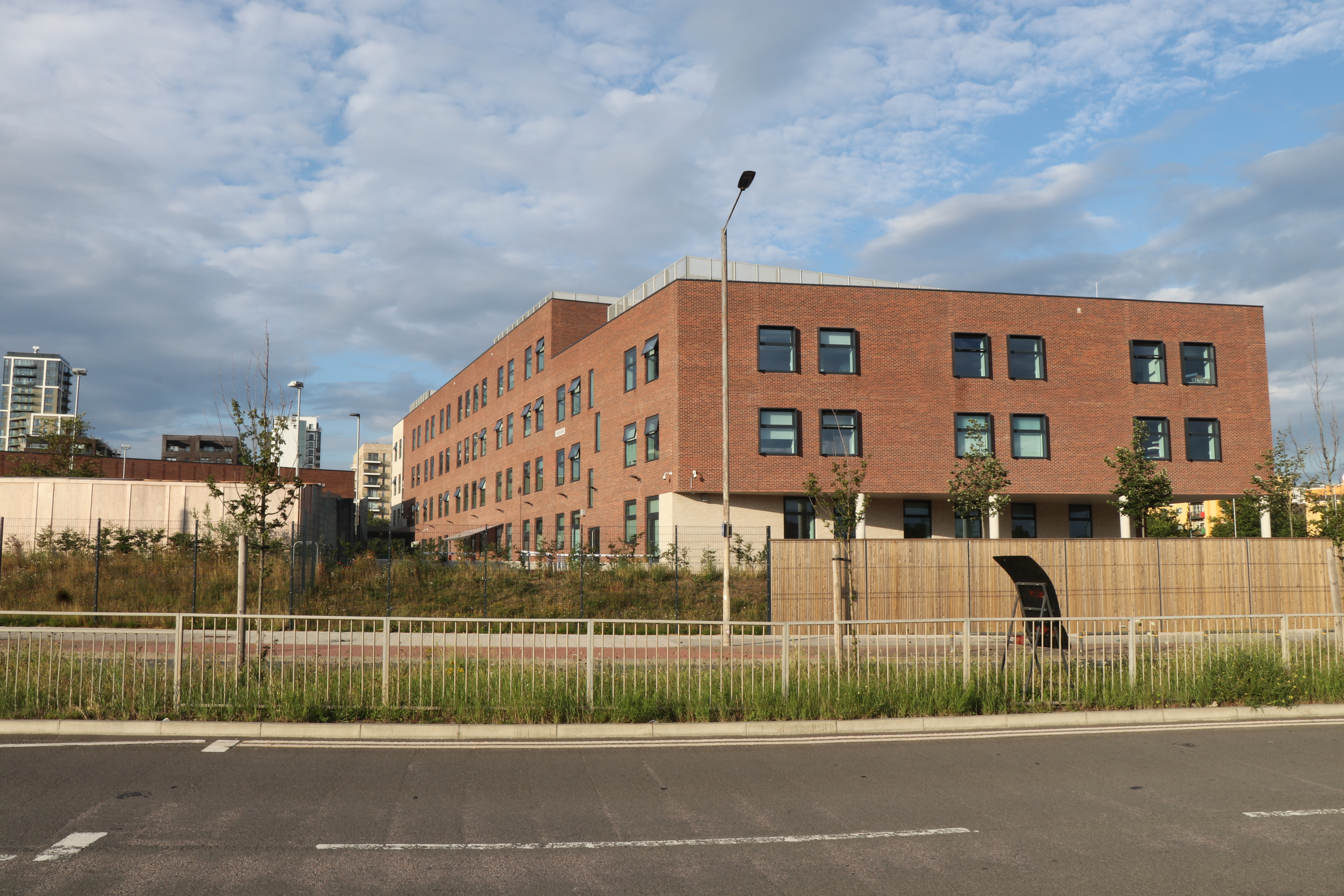
St Mary Magdalene All Through School - Greenwich Peninsula buildings from west
