= Julia Fraser =

- Born: 1841; Woolwich
- Died: 1915; Edinburgh
- Occupations: Playwright, novelist
- Father: Simon Fraser

Julia Agnes Fraser (1841–1915) was a Scottish playwright and novelist, perhaps best known for the play Dermot O'Donoghue; or, The Stranger from Belfast (1873).

Julia Fraser was born in 1841 in Woolwich, the daughter of Major General Simon Fraser, Royal Marines.

Fraser wrote a number of works about Ireland from a decidedly unionist perspective. In her short work, Universal Equality; or, Jonathan Baxter's Peep Into the Future (1871), English shopkeeper Jonathan Baxter dreams about a future universal equality. In future Ireland (complete with Irish brogue), land is taken from landlords and distributed to the people, but the laziness of many leads others to demand a return to landlords. Shrilrick, the Drummer (1894) is the story of 14 year old Irish drummer boy Shilrick O’Toole. Shilrick O’Toole serves with the Royal Marines during the Irish Rebellion of 1798 along-side a number of Irish loyal to the British Empire, while among the rebels are O'Toole's own brother Kerry O'Toole. Shilrick O’Toole remains loyal to the British yet refuses to lead their forces to the rebel hideout, for which he is sentenced to death by firing squad for treason. Inexplicably, Shilrick survives and receives a pardon.

Julia Fraser died in 1915 in Edinburgh.

== Bibliography ==
- Hubert's pride. A comedy, in one act. Strathaven: Alexander Morton, 1871.
- Universal Equality; or, Jonathan Baxter's Peep Into the Future. Edinburgh: John Menzies & Co., 1871.
- A slight mistake. A farce in one act. London: Remington; Edinburgh, Strathaven: John Menzies, 1872.
- Patrick's Vow. 1873.
- Dermot O'Donoghue; or, The stranger from Belfast. 1876.
- Pat of Mullingar; or, An Irish lothario. An original Irish comedy in three acts. Greenock: Greenock Advertiser office, 1879.
- Shrilrick, the Drummer: or, Loyal and True: A Romance of the Irish Rebellion of 1798. 3 vol. London: Remington, 1894.
- Barrington's busby; or, Weathering the admiral. Comedietta in one act. Plymouth: Trend & co., 1890.
- Court lovers: or the Sentinal of the King's guard. An original musical comedy in four acts. Plymouth: Trend & co.,1891.
- The star-spangled banner; or, The far west. An Irish American military drama. In a prologue and six acts. Plymouth: Trend & co., 1894.
- Idle words; or, death and glory. 1896.
