= Royal Arsenal =

Public community common, and housing, formerly a Military owned site

Coordinates: 51.4912°N 0.0699°E

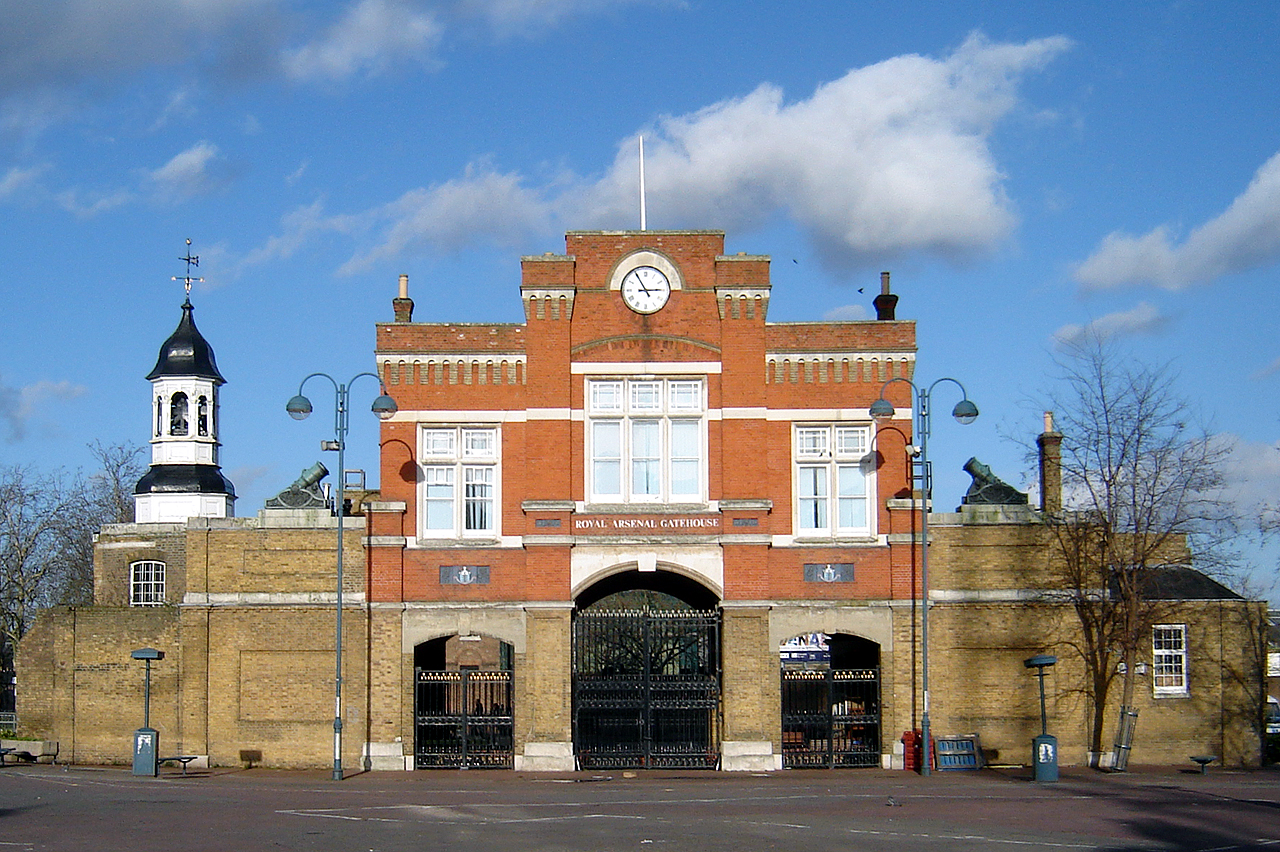
Royal Arsenal Gatehouse (Beresford Gate) in 2007

The Royal Arsenal, Woolwich is an establishment on the south bank of the River Thames in Woolwich in south-east London, England, that was used for the manufacture of armaments and ammunition, proofing, and explosives research for the British armed forces. It was originally known as the Woolwich Warren, having begun on land previously used as a domestic warren in the grounds of a mid-16th century Tudor house, Tower Place. Much of the initial history of the site is linked with that of the Office of Ordnance, which purchased the Warren in the late 17th century in order to expand an earlier base at Gun Wharf in Woolwich Dockyard.

Over the next two centuries, as operations grew and innovations were pursued, the site expanded massively. At the time of the First World War the Arsenal covered 1,285 acres (520 ha) and employed close to 80,000 people. Thereafter its operations were scaled down. It finally closed as a factory in 1967 and the Ministry of Defence moved out in 1994. Today the area, so long a secret enclave, is open to the public and is being redeveloped for housing and community use.

== 17th-century origins: the Gun Wharf and Tower Place ==
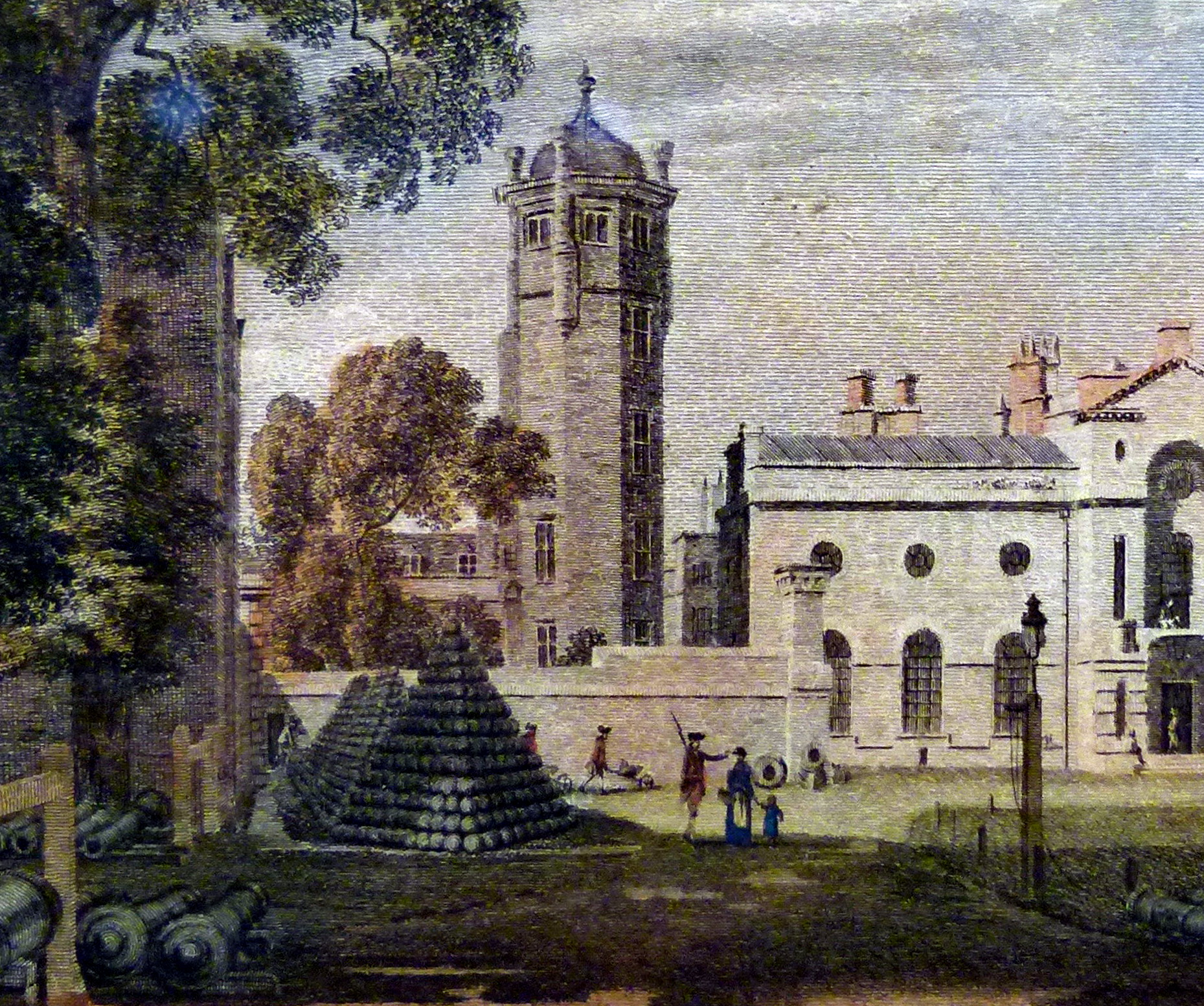
The octagonal tower of Tower Place alongside the Royal Military Academy

The Royal Arsenal had its origins in a domestic warren at Tower Place in Old Woolwich. Tower Place was a Tudor mansion built in the 1540s for Martin Bowes, a wealthy goldsmith and merchant, later Lord Mayor of London. The house with its octagonal tower stood nearby Gun Wharf (the original site of Woolwich Dockyard where the Henry Grace à Dieu had been built around 1515). After the Dockyard moved west in the 1540s, Gun Wharf was acquired by the Office of Ordnance and mainly used for gun storage.

In 1651, the owners of Tower Place gave the board permission to prove its guns on the warren that formed part of their land. That same year the first proof butts were built on the site, under the board's direction (24 years later they were enlarged, to enable more guns to be proved at each firing).

=== Purchase of the site ===
In 1667, in response to the raid on the Medway, a gun battery (known as Prince Rupert's Battery, being under the command of the King's cousin) was built in the grounds of the house, designed to defend London in the event of a similar raid on the Thames. The following year, Tower Place was acquired by Sir William Pritchard who promptly entered into negotiations to sell it to the Board of Ordnance; and in 1671, the 31-acre (13 ha) estate was given to the board in exchange for the Gun Wharf and a substantial amount of cash. The board at the time declared the site to be "a convenient place for building a storehouse for powder and other stores of war, and for room for the proof of guns". The first Storekeeper, Captain Francis Cheeseman, was appointed in 1670 by Warrant of the Master-General of the Ordnance.

=== Proof and experiment ===
In 1681, King Charles II visited the Warren and observed Richard Leake, Master Gunner of England, conduct an experiment with fire-shot in the proof butts. In 1682 what had till then been the board's main proving ground (in 'Old Artillery Garden' near its headquarters in the Tower of London) was closed and its staff and activities were promptly moved to Tower Place. That year a thousand cannon and ten thousand cannonballs were sent to Woolwich from the Tower, and the proof butts were further expanded.

When the constitution of the Board of Ordnance was formalised by Charles II in 1683, two Proof Masters were appointed, under the Surveyor-General of the Ordnance, to ensure that proofs and trials were conducted correctly and the results duly certified. In 1684 the King paid another visit, when Leake conducted a trial of his newly developed mortar design.

=== Centralisation of ordnance stores ===
In 1688 it was ordered that 'all guns, carriages and stores now at Deptford, be removed to Woolwich, and from henceforth new ordnance and carriages be laid there'. No manufacturing took place at this stage, however, except for the periodical production of fireworks for state celebrations; (between 1681 and 1694 saltpetre, a key ingredient of gunpowder, was regularly refined on the site).

In due course, the site as a whole became known as The Warren.

== 18th century: The Warren ==
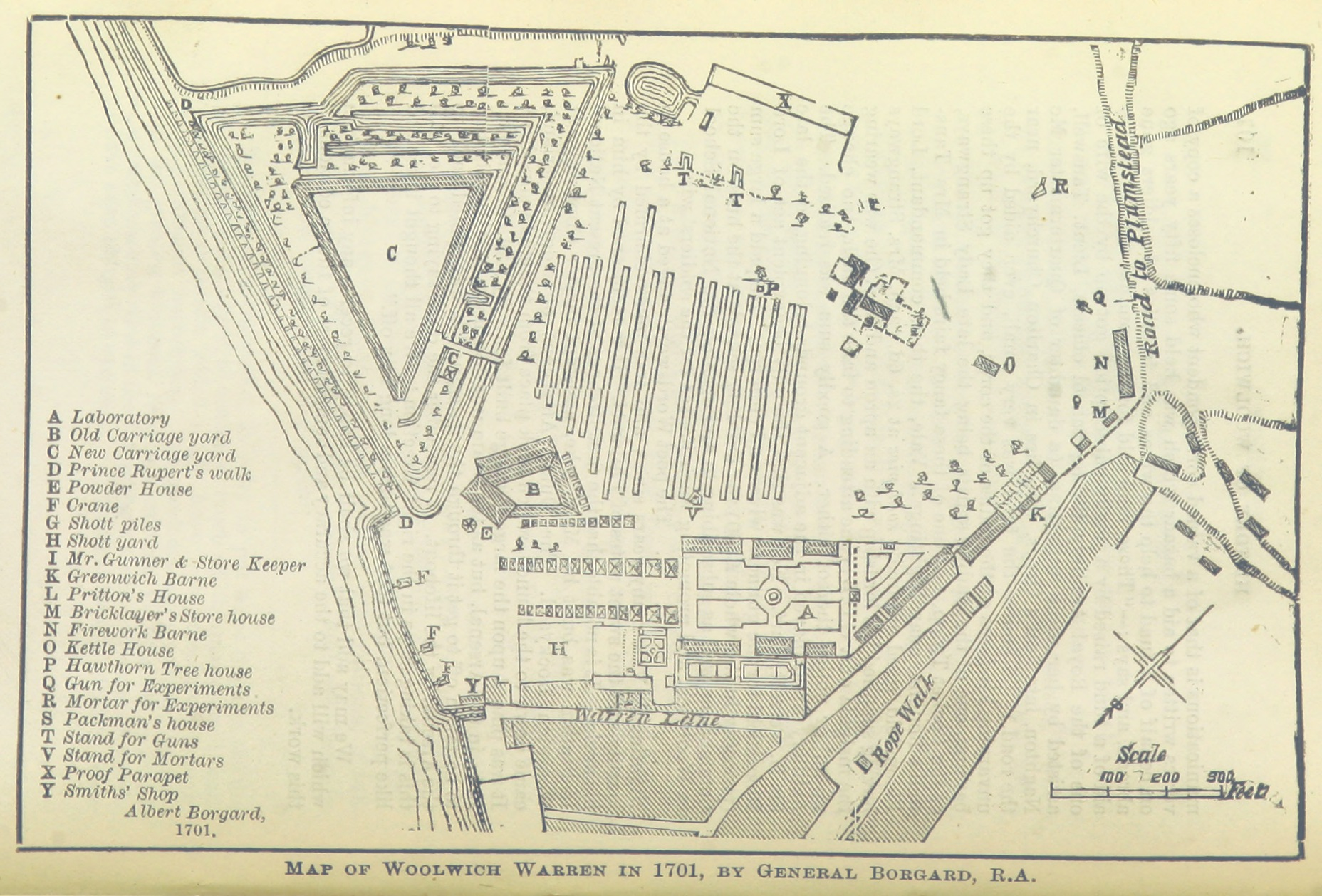
A map drawn in 1701 shows a triangle of carriage sheds (built over Prince Rupert's Battery, top left), proof butts and experiment area (top right), the Laboratory quadrangle (bottom) and land in between used for storage

The Board of Ordnance was both a civil and a military office of State, independent of the Army, overseen by a high-ranking official, the Master-General of the Ordnance. Both branches, civil and military, were represented at the Warren; indeed there was a great deal of overlap: military officers for the most part headed up the civil departments, and civilians often worked alongside the military personnel.

=== The civil establishment ===
For most of its history, the civil establishment of the Warren/Arsenal consisted of the following four departments:

- The Storekeeper's Department (which managed storage of all kinds of 'warlike stores')
- The Royal Laboratory (which manufactured ammunition of all kinds, for small arms as well as artillery)
- The Royal Brass Foundry (which manufactured artillery pieces and was later renamed the Royal Gun Factory)
- The Royal Carriage Department (which manufactured gun carriages)

In addition, proof butts continued to be maintained by the Board of Ordnance to test guns beyond their normal operational limits and for experimenting with new types of ammunition.

==== The storekeeper's department ====
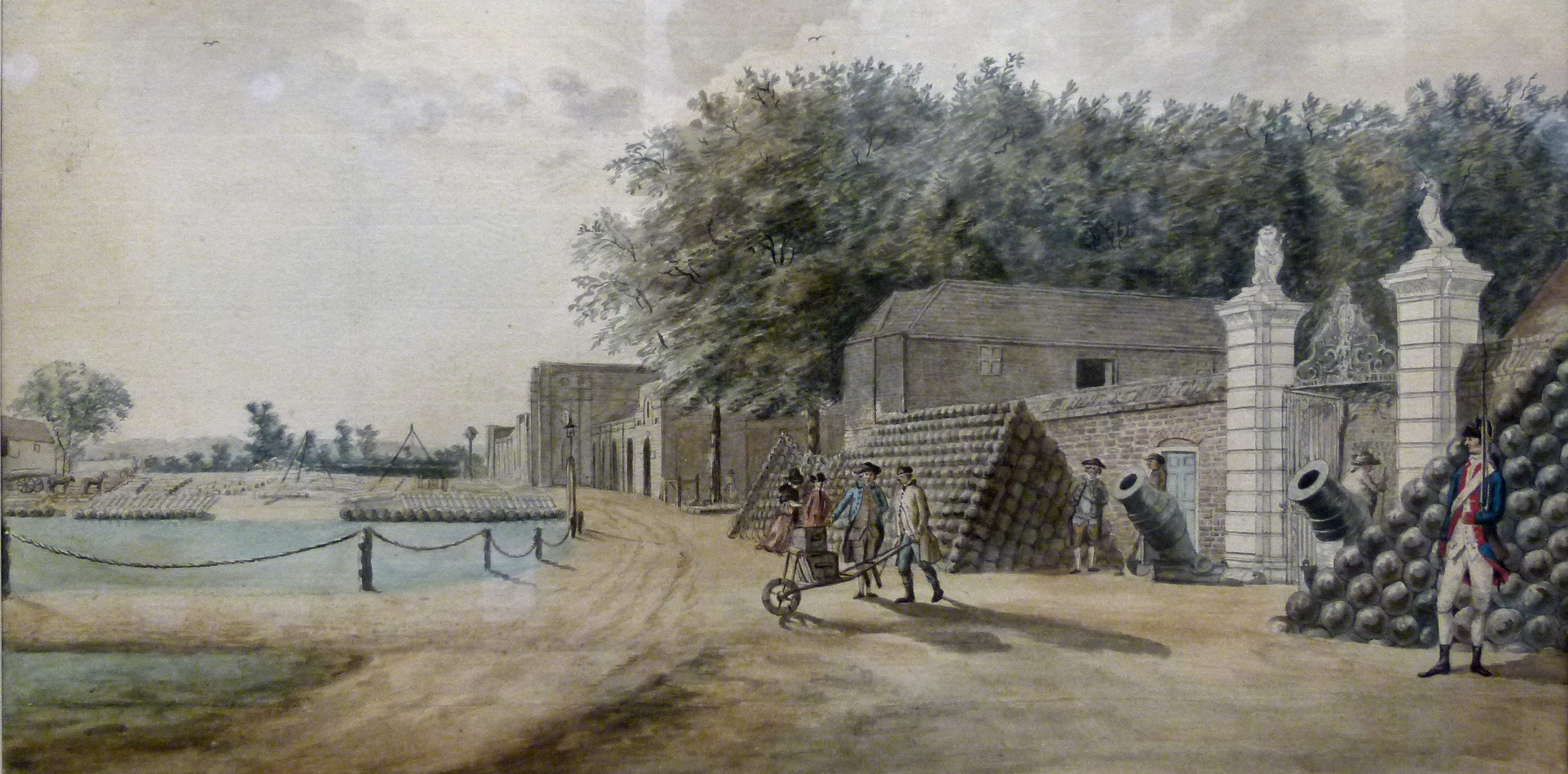
Shot stacked up outside the Royal Laboratory gates and rows of guns arrayed in the background (James Cockburn, 1795).

First and foremost, the Warren was established as an Ordnance storage depot. As at the board's other depots, the site was overseen by an official called the storekeeper, who was provided with an official residence in Tower Place itself. The Storekeeper not only controlled the receipt, safekeeping and issue of all the items that were stored on the site; he was also responsible (until the early 1800s) for issuing payments on the board's behalf to all personnel across the different departments. He was assisted by a clerk of the cheque, clerk of the survey and other administrative staff.

To begin with much of the Warren was preserved as open space with cannons stored in the open air and guns proved on ranges to the east. (Proof-testing was overseen at this time by the Master Gunner of England, who was also accommodated in Tower Place.) Gunpowder was stored in a converted dovecote initially; but before long specialist buildings began to appear.

==== The Royal Laboratory ====
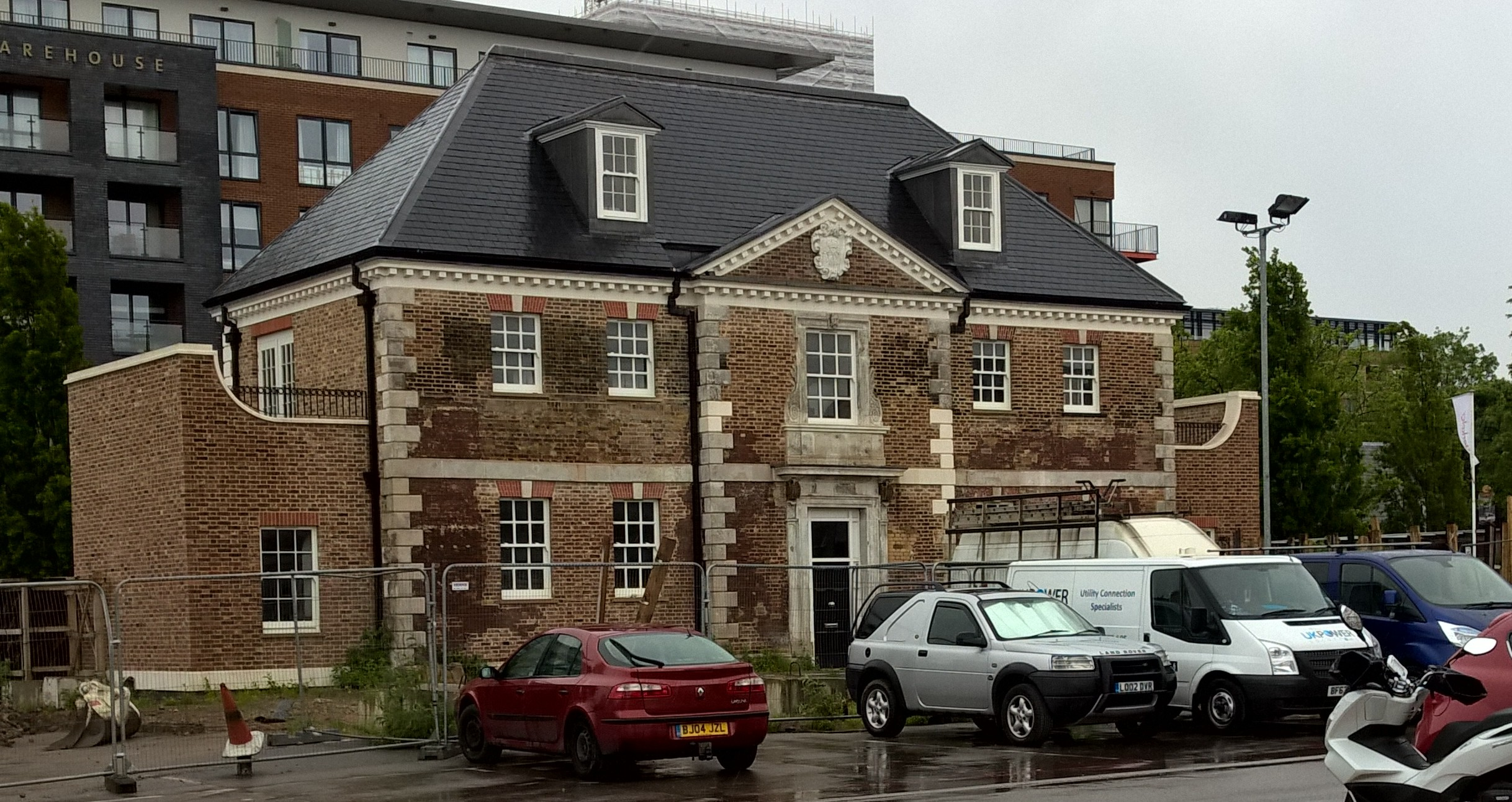
One of a pair of 17th-century pavilions, the earliest buildings on the site, undergoing restoration (2015)

An ammunition laboratory (i.e. workshop) was set up at the Warren in 1695, overseen by the Comptroller of Fireworks. Manufacture of ammunition had previously taken place within a Great Barn on the tilt-yard at Greenwich Palace (an offshoot of the royal armoury there); but in 1695 construction of Greenwich Hospital began on the palace site, so the laboratory was relocated downstream at Woolwich (the barn building itself was even disassembled and rebuilt at the Warren). In 1696 Laboratory Square was built to house its operations, which included manufacture of gunpowder, shell cases, fuses and paper gun cartridges; it consisted of a quadrangle with a gateway at the north end, buildings along either side and a clock tower at the south end, beyond which further buildings were ranged. The manufacturing process was conducted by hand, overseen by a Chief Firemaster; early paintings show artisans at work in the courtyards among pyramid stacks of shells. A pair of pavilions, which once faced each other across the centre of the courtyard, are now the oldest surviving buildings on the Arsenal site; they were being restored for residential use in 2013.

The Comptroller, Royal Laboratory, had oversight of the Royal Gunpowder Mills in addition to the Woolwich manufactory. From time to time there were public demonstrations of the work of the Laboratory, often in Hyde Park, and by the mid-18th century it was customary for the Royal Laboratory to provide an official 'fireworks display' on occasions such as coronations, peace treaties, royal jubilees etc.

==== The Royal Brass Foundry ====
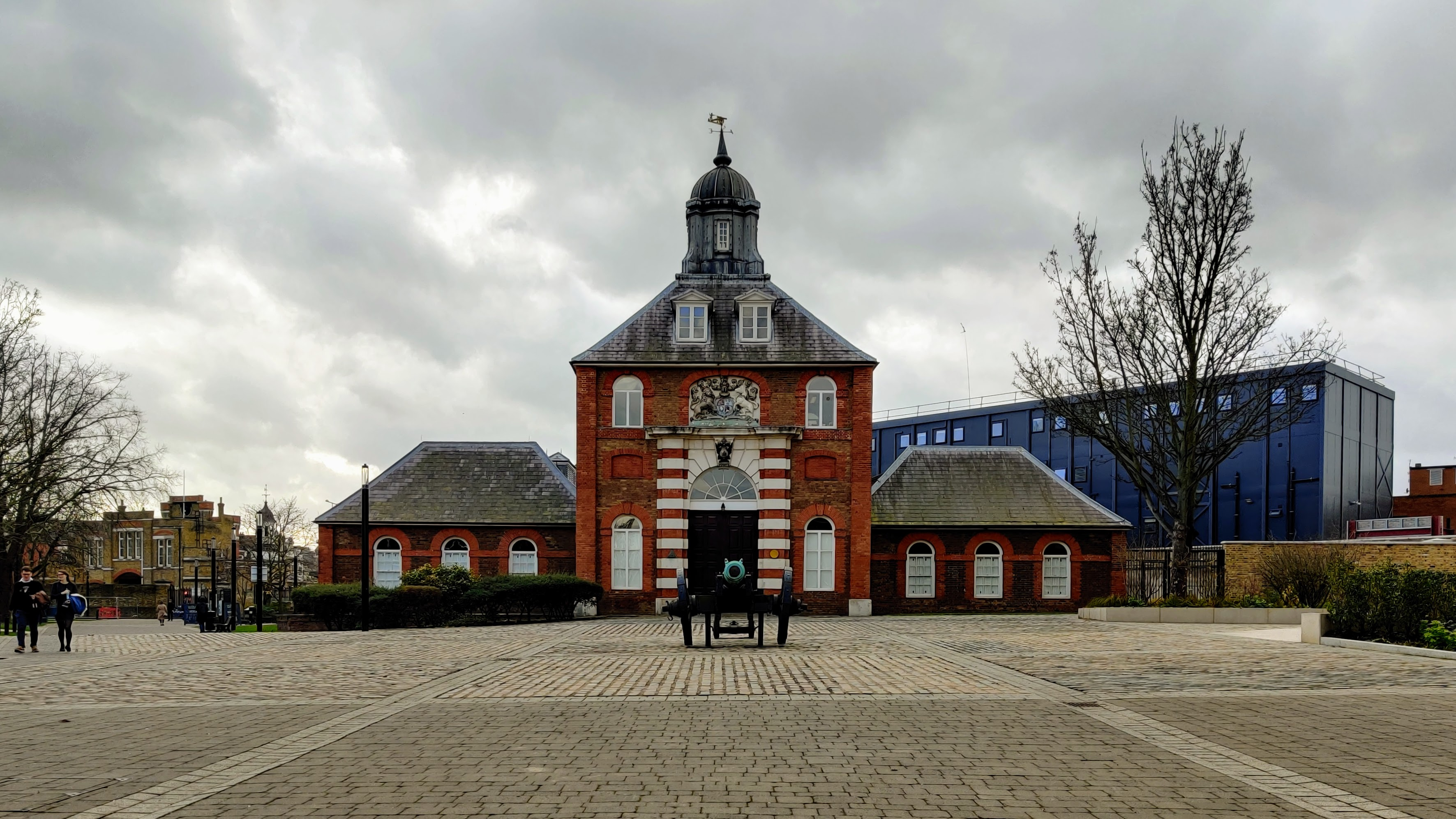
The Royal Brass Foundry (1717)

A gun foundry, overseen by a Master Founder, was established in 1717. (The decision of the Board of Ordnance to set up and supervise its own foundry operations followed a devastating explosion at the private foundry it had previously used in Moorfields.) In Woolwich, the original Royal Brass Foundry building survives (built on the site of the relocated "Greenwich Barn"). Its handsome exterior encloses a space designed for pure industrial functionality, with height to accommodate a vertical boring machine, and tall doors permitting easy removal of newly made cannons.

Completed guns could then be taken through what is now Dial Arch into a complex known as the 'Great Pile of buildings' (built 1717–20) to be finished and stored. Behind the surviving frontage and archway was a small courtyard in which the newly forged guns were turned, washed and engraved; beyond which two large gun-carriage storehouses stood (one for the Navy, one for the Army) at either end of a larger quadrangle, with workshops alongside.

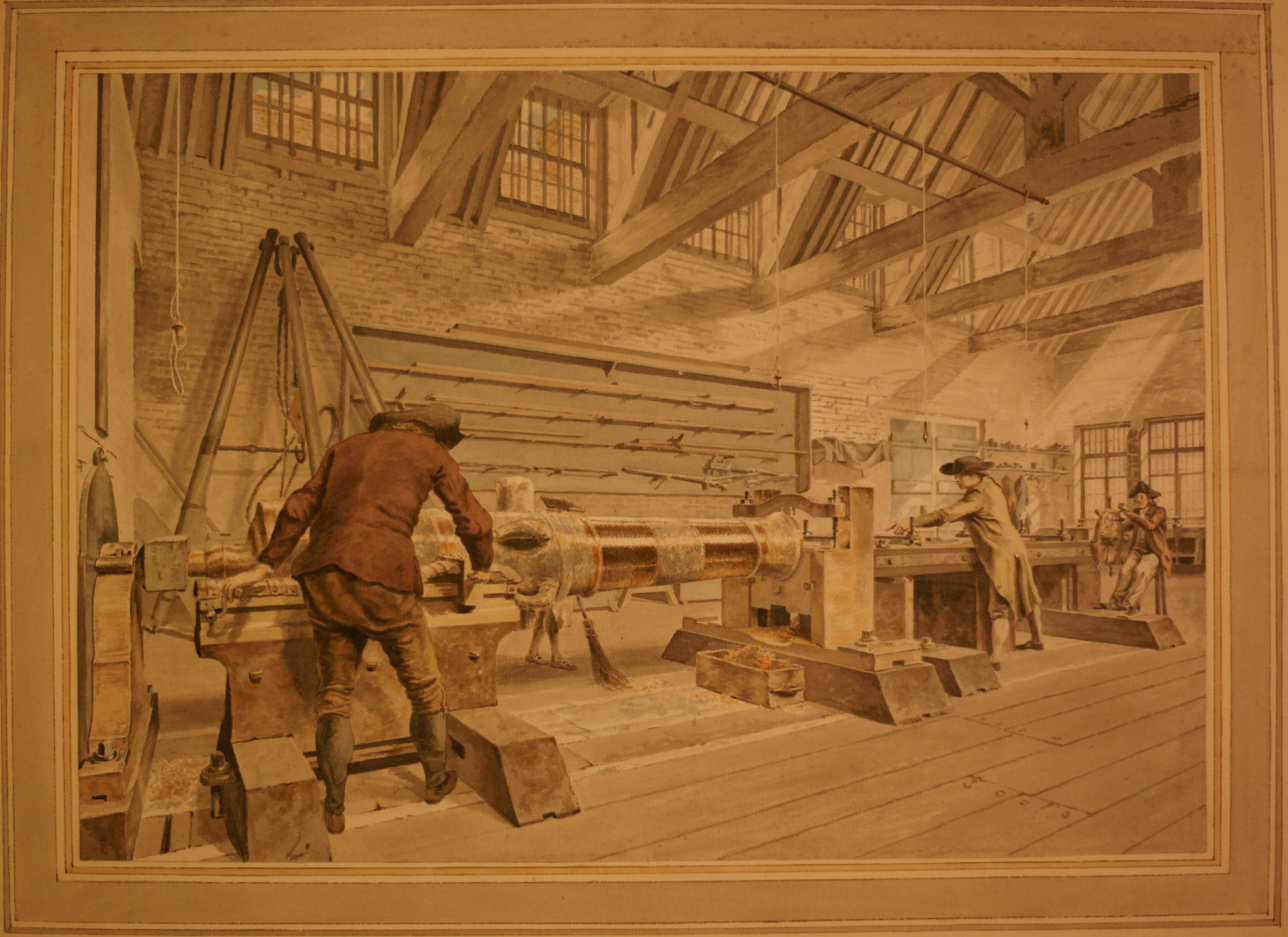
Verbruggen's horizontal boring machine at Woolwich

The first Master Founder, Andrew Schalch, served in post for 54 years before retiring in 1769 at the age of 78. In 1770 a revolutionary horse-powered horizontal boring machine was installed in the Foundry by his successor, Jan Verbruggen which inspired Henry Maudslay (who worked at the foundry from 1783) to his inventions improving the lathe. Remarkably, it remained in use until 1843 when a steam-powered equivalent replaced it.

From 1780 a new official, the Inspector of Artillery, was given oversight of the Royal Brass Foundry and of other aspects of gun manufacture including carriage-making (for the time being) and proof-testing, which continued to take place on ranges to the east; (over the next hundred years the proof ranges were moved progressively further eastwards as the Arsenal continued to expand).

==== The carriage works ====
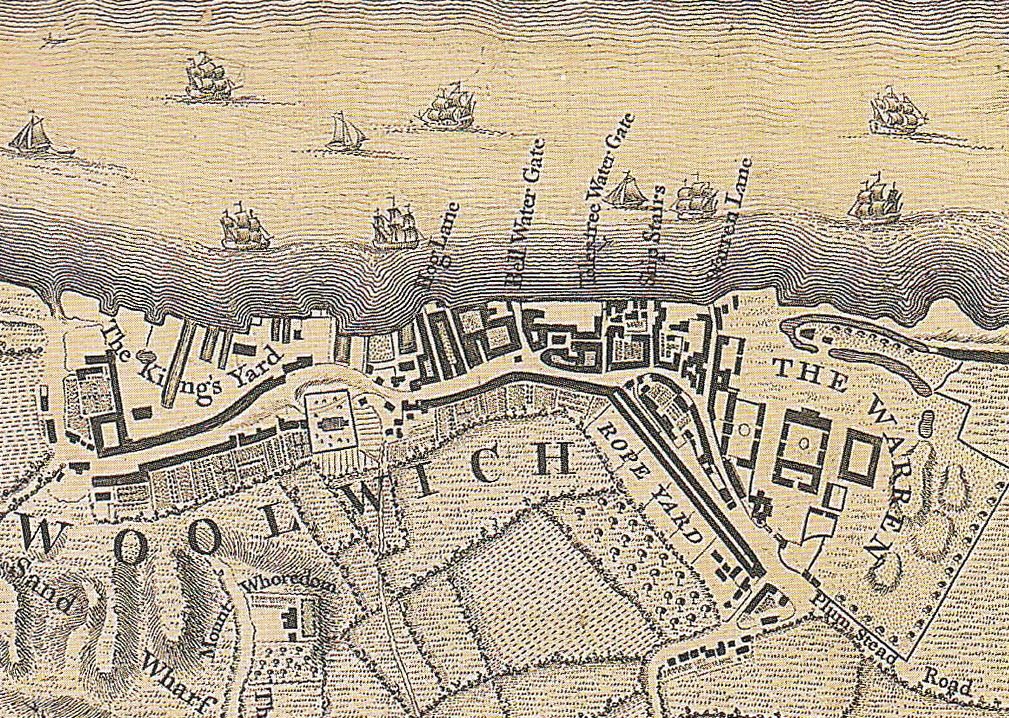
A map of 1746 shows 'The Warren' (right) with its three quadrangles: (from left-right) the original Laboratory (1696), the 'Great Pile' (1717–20) and New Carriage Square (1728–9)

From the beginning, gun carriages had been stored at the Warren (unlike the guns themselves the wooden carriages had to be kept under cover). The first store ('Old Carriage Yard') had been built as early as 1682, and probably also contained workshops for the repair or scrapping of old carriages. In 1697 a far larger complex of sheds ('New Carriage Yard') was built on what had been Prince Rupert's gun battery.

By the 1750s manufacture of gun carriages was also taking place on site, overseen by the Constructor of Carriages. This took place around New Carriage Square (a low quadrangle of storehouses built alongside, and as an extension of, the Great Pile storehouses in 1728–1729). In 1803 this activity was formalized as the Royal Carriage Department, a recognition of the importance of effective carriage design and manufacture, alongside that of guns and ammunition, as part of ordnance provision.

=== The military establishment ===
By 1700 the Board of Ordnance had a team of 20 gunners stationed in the Warren, overseen by the Master Gunner of England, who (except in time of war) assisted in the manufacture as well as the proving of cannons. Building, repair and technical work was undertaken by the board's (civil) artificers, who were drafted in from the Tower of London as and when required. In many respects 'there was no distinction between the Ordnance soldier and the Ordnance civilian' at this time, and a close working relationship endured between the two constituencies across subsequent decades.

The military constitution of the Board of Ordnance was strengthened when, on 26 May 1716, a Royal Warrant directed that two companies of artillery (of a hundred men each, plus officers) and a separate corps of twenty-six military engineers (all officers) be formed on a permanent basis: this marked the foundation of the Royal Artillery and the Royal Engineers. Both had their headquarters in the Warren for a time and (when not mobilized for war) they were regularly engaged in its work.

==== The regiment of artillery ====
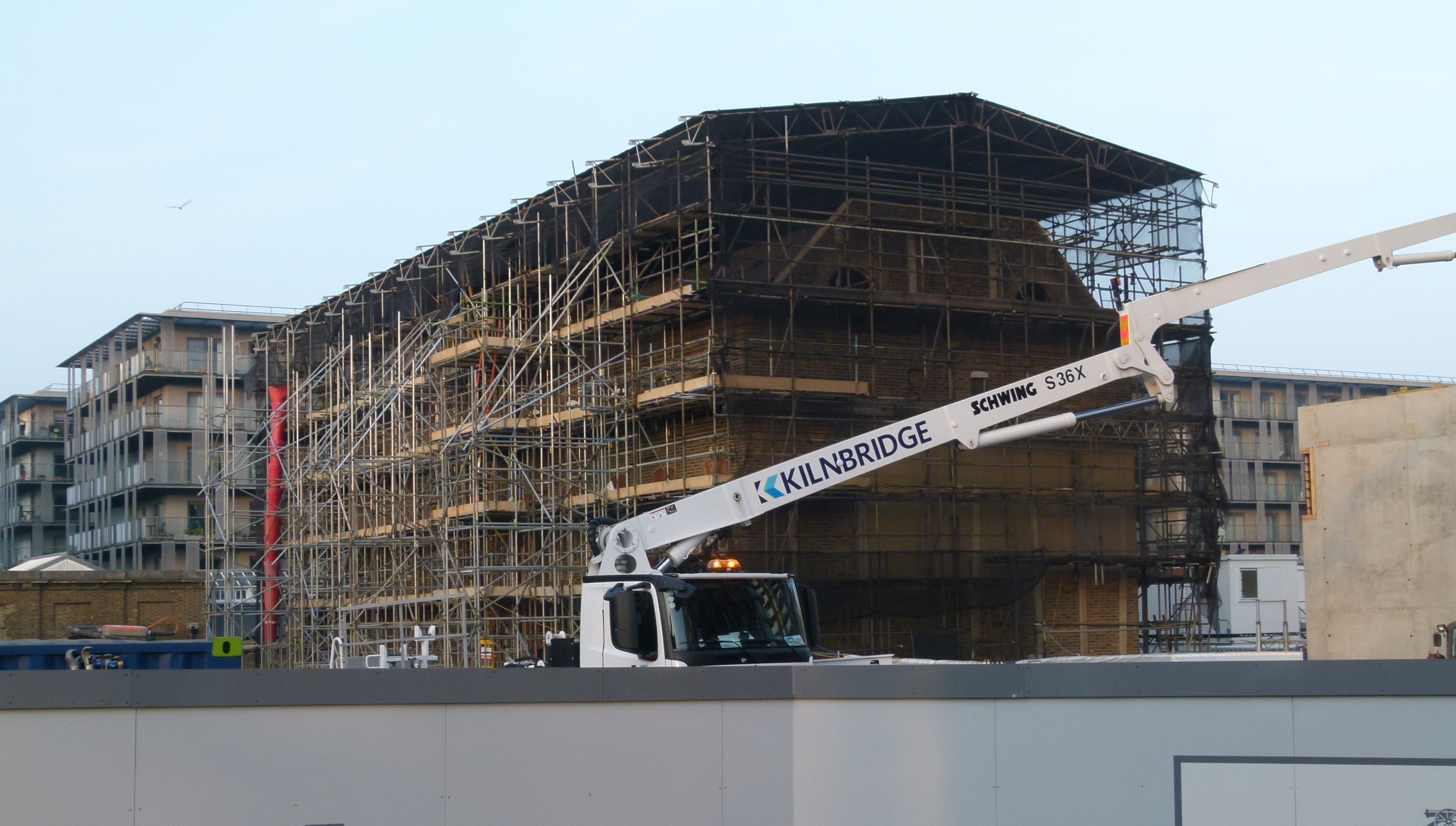
Former barracks of 1739 undergoing renovation in 2016

The two companies of artillery (referred to as 'Royal Artillery' by 1720) were quartered and based at the Warren. By 1722 the detachment had grown and was formally named the Royal Regiment of Artillery. These troops (who were not under the command of the Army but of the Board of Ordnance) provided a versatile workforce on site, as well as helping ensure its security. In 1719 they were provided with their own barracks within the compound, close to Dial Arch: a single block was built, housing 200 men in open barracks accommodation across four floors, with a pair of officers' houses incorporated at each end. (This block has since been demolished, but an identical block (now known as Building 11), survives; it was built alongside the first in 1739–1740, the Regiment having been enlarged).

After the formation of the Regiment in 1716, the Royal Artillery took on responsibility for conducting proof tests and the (recently renamed) post of Master Gunner of Great Britain was abolished. Proving guns at the Warren became part of routine training for gunners of the Royal Artillery, overseen at first by the Board's proofmaster-general (and then, after 1780, by the Inspector of Artillery). In addition to the proof butts, a range was set up in 1787 for gunnery practice, firing parallel to the river across Plumstead Marshes.

==== The Corps of Engineers ====
An Order in Council (dated 22 August 1717) increased the size of the Engineer Corps to fifty officers (including the Chief Engineer). Serving under the Board of Ordnance, they received their commissions from the Master-General until 1757 when the King granted them commission and rank equivalent to officers of the Army. In a Royal Warrant of 1787 the Corps (which was still composed solely of officers) was renamed the Corps of Royal Engineers.

Initially, civilians were employed as workers, but in 1787 a Corps of Royal Military Artificers was formed: a body of non-commissioned officers and men who were placed under the command of officers from the Corps of Royal Engineers. From 1795 both these Corps were headquartered in the Warren; alongside their other duties, they had responsibility for the design, construction and maintenance of buildings, wharves and other features across the Arsenal site.

==== The Royal Military Academy ====
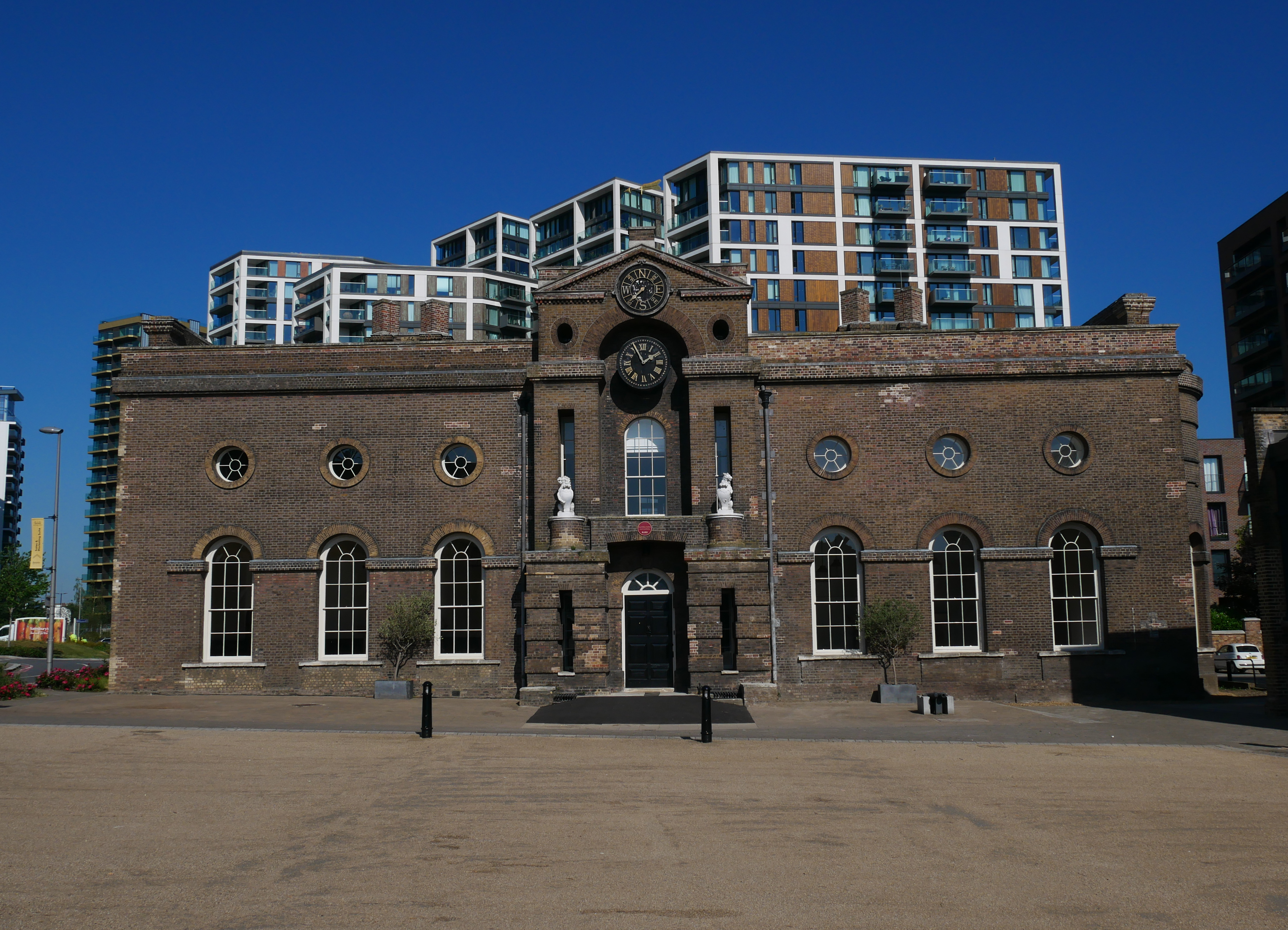
The original Royal Military Academy building (1718–20) within the Arsenal complex; it later served as the Royal Arsenal Officers' Mess until 1994

In 1720, the Board sought to establish an on-site military academy for the education of its Artillery and Engineer officers. Tower Place had by this time largely been demolished, and a new building was erected in its place to provide a base for the new academy alongside a Board Room for the Ordnance Board (with a new residence for the Storekeeper added to the rear). It would not be until 1741, however, that the Royal Military Academy was set up on a firm footing and occupied its rooms in the building. Soon, the academy's cadets were given their own purpose-built barracks alongside the southern boundary wall; dating from 1751, these were entirely demolished in the 1980s for road widening.

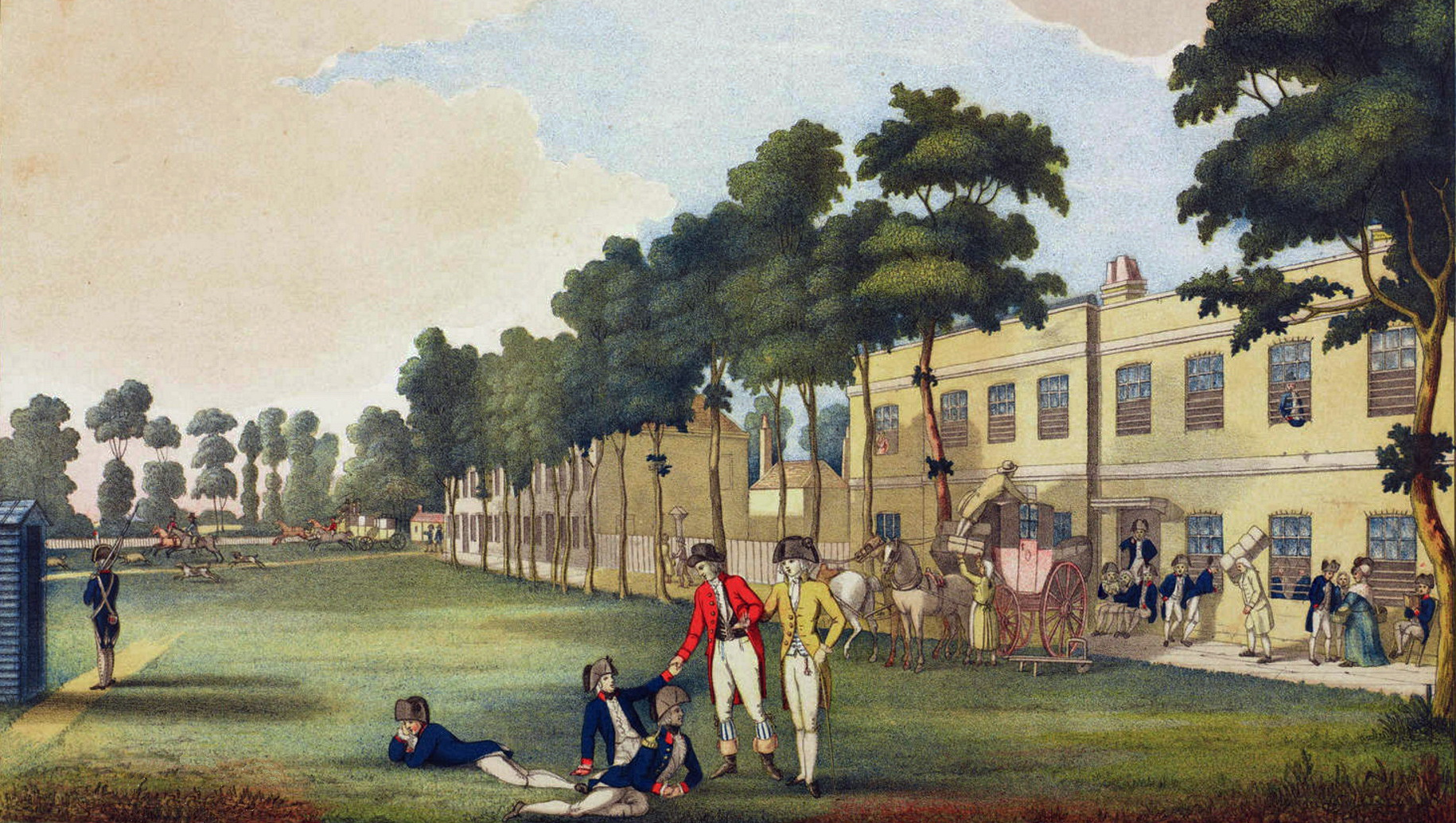
The Cadet Barracks, which stood just east of Beresford Gate, in 1851.

==== The Royal Military Repository ====
An offshoot of the academy was the Royal Military Repository. In the 1770s Captain William Congreve built a "Repository for Military Machines" between New Carriage Square and some open ground to the east. The building housed an educative display of cannons and mortars, and the open space was used as a training ground to help develop skills in handling large artillery pieces on various terrains in different conflict scenarios.

==== The Ordnance Field Train ====
In 1792, with Britain on the cusp of war with France, the Board of Ordnance established a Field Train department to ensure supply and storage of guns, ammunition and other equipment for its Artillery and Engineers serving in the field of battle. The small corps (which had its headquarters in the Arsenal) was composed of a permanent cadre of officers, who were supplemented at time of war by uniformed civilians (many of whom were volunteers recruited from the ordnance storekeeper's department). In addition, a number of Royal Artillery sergeants served in the Field Train as Conductors. (The Ordnance Field Train was disbanded following the abolition of the Board of Ordnance, but is now seen as a precursor of the Royal Army Ordnance Corps). The Field Train had its offices in the main guard house and stored its guns, carriages and other equipment in a large building known as the Blue Storehouse (which was near the old Carriage Yard).

==== Removal of the military to Woolwich Common ====
By the 1770s the number of artillerymen accommodated in the Warren had increased to 900, prompting the construction of a new Royal Artillery Barracks on the north side of Woolwich Common, where they moved in 1777; whereupon their old barracks were converted into terraces of houses (they continued to house artillery officers for some years, and were later used for senior staff of the Royal Laboratory). The Commandant Woolwich Garrison remained quartered in the Arsenal until 1839, when he was provided with a new house on Woolwich Common (Government House).

The Royal Military Repository was destroyed along with New Carriage Square in the fire of 1802, but soon re-established itself just west of the new Artillery Barracks in the area now known as the Repository Grounds (which continue to be used for military training to this day). What survived of the items on display at the Repository came to be housed in the Rotunda there from 1820 (having been kept in the old Academy building in the interim), where they formed the nucleus of a new Royal Artillery Museum.

In place of the old Repository in the Warren, a new Royal Engineers Establishment was built in 1803 (next to, and contemporary with, the new Carriage Factory). It was a sizeable quadrangle of workshops and other facilities, which served as the Royal Engineers' headquarters until 1856 (when it was converted into a wheel factory for the adjacent Royal Carriage Works). Also in 1803, the Royal Military Artificers were provided with new barracks, outside the Warren (south of Love Lane, halfway between the Warren and the Common); the corps was renamed the Royal Sappers and Miners in 1812. In 1824 the Commanding Royal Engineer, until then resident in the Arsenal, was given a new house in Mill Lane on the edge of the Common. In 1856 the Royal Sappers and Miners merged with the Royal Engineers and the headquarters of the newly unified Corps was moved from Woolwich to Chatham; a small detachment of Engineer officers was retained in Woolwich, however, alongside the house in Mill Lane, where an office building and a works yard were built. The Royal Engineers (after a brief hiatus) retained responsibility for design and construction of the Arsenal's buildings and other structures, latterly as part of the Building Works Department, which remained active until the 1950s.

The Ordnance Field Train also left the Warren, in 1804, moving scores of combat-ready field guns and large stocks of ammunition into the newly built carriage sheds and magazines of what became known as the Grand Depôt (which stretched from the new Artificers' barracks up towards the new Artillery barracks).

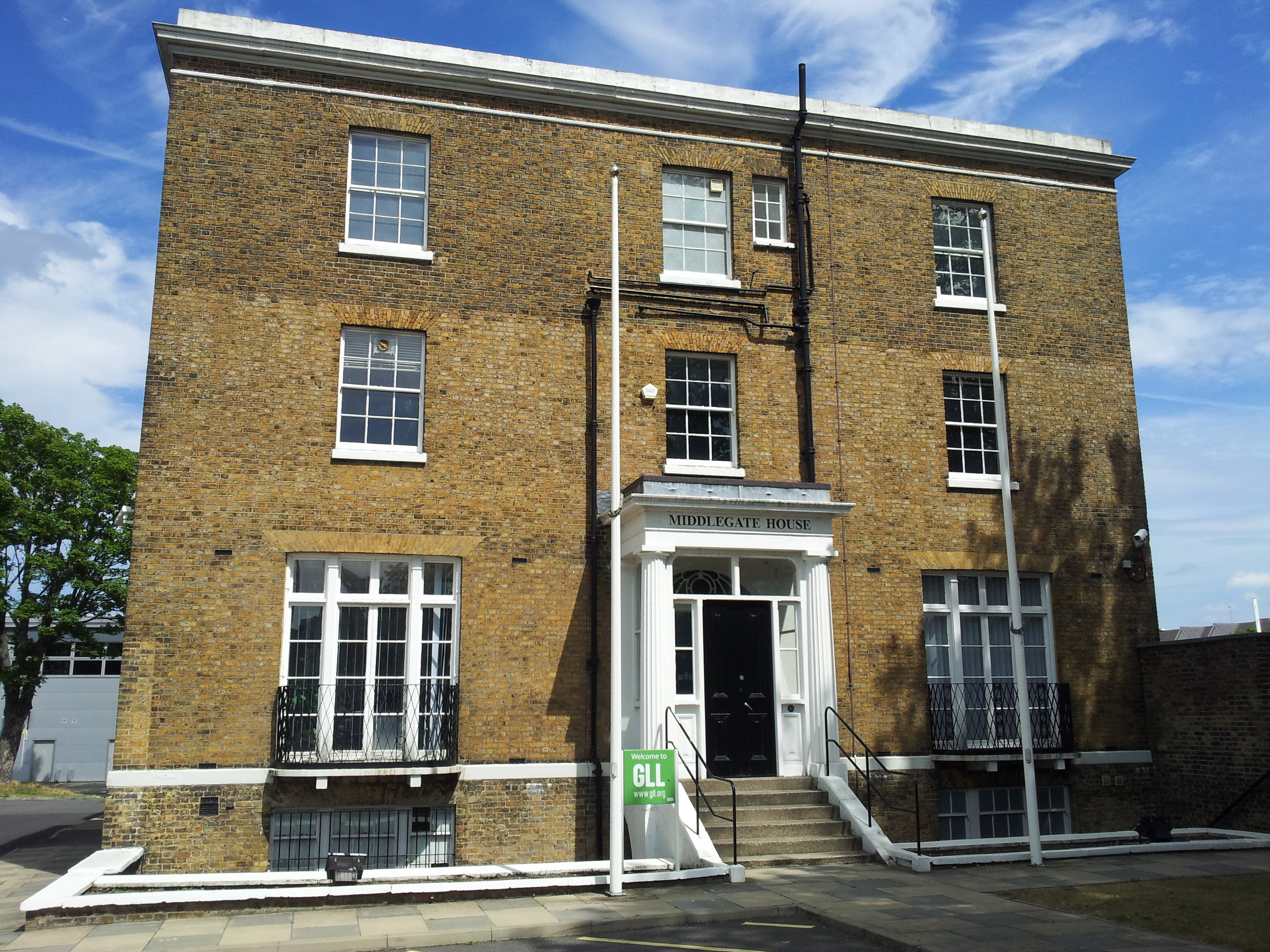
Storekeeper's House (1807–10), latterly known as Middlegate House.

The Royal Military Academy was relocated to the south side of the Common in 1806. The old Academy building, together with the adjacent Storekeeper's residence, then became part of the Royal Laboratory; so the Storekeeper (who still had seniority within the Arsenal) was given a sizeable new house on what was then the south-east edge of the site (later overtaken by expansion, it came to be named after the nearby Middle Gate, the second of three main gates in the Arsenal's perimeter wall). The Cadet Barracks continued to be occupied by the academy for some time afterwards, initially housing the 'Lower Establishment' (junior cadets), and later accommodating the Practical Class, formed of senior cadets awaiting commission. From the 1860s the cadet barracks began to be converted for other uses, but they were still occasionally used by the academy as overflow accommodation until as late as 1882.

=== Consolidation of the site ===
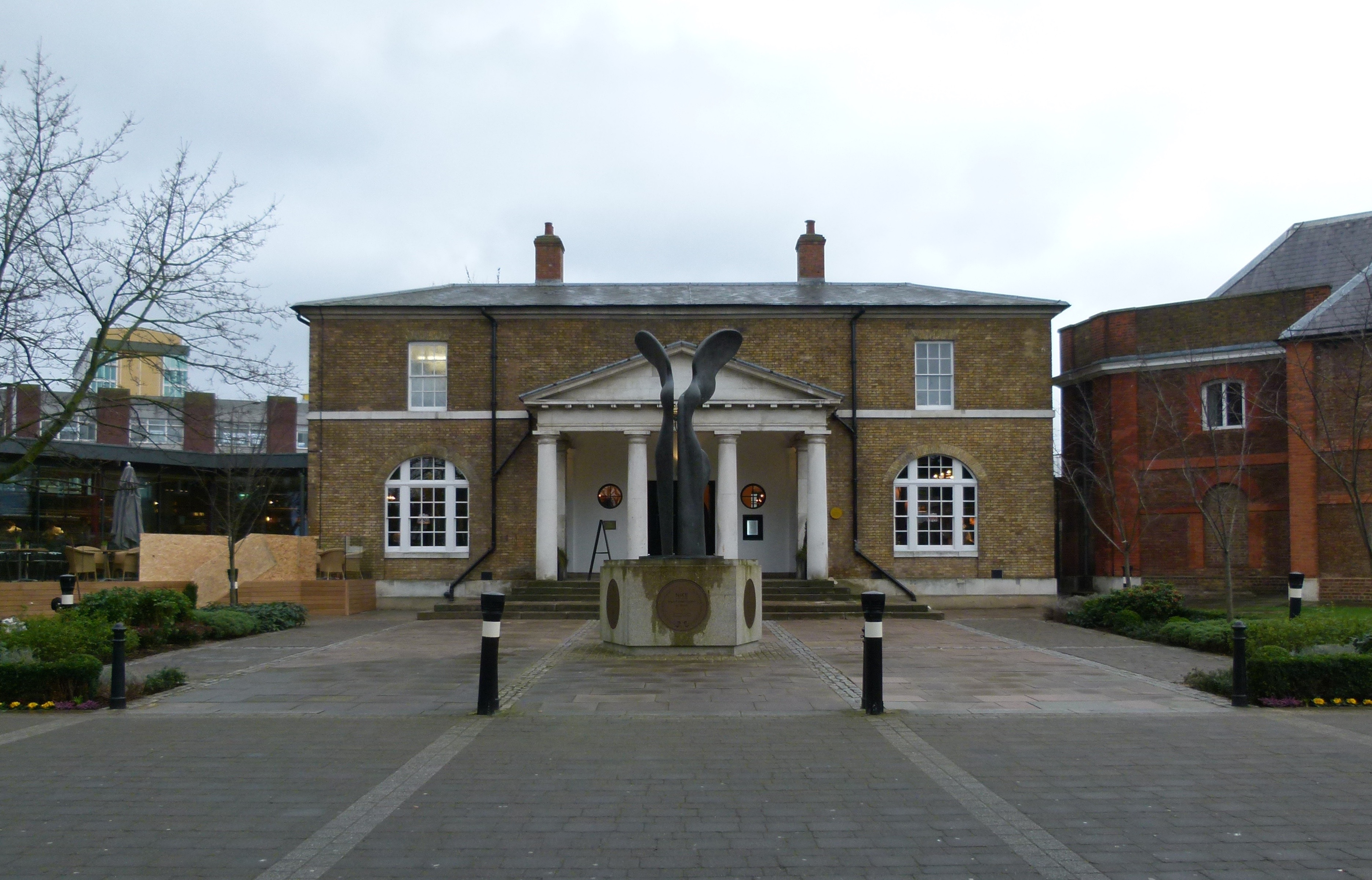
The Main Guard House (1787–8) provided accommodation for a detachment of Artillery after the regiment moved to the Common

By 1777 the site had expanded to 104 acres (42 ha). The purchase that year of additional land to the east allowed the proof butts to be relocated, realigned and extended in 1779. This in turn freed up additional land on the old Warren site which would be used for a series of substantial building projects in the early 19th century.

In 1777–1778, convict labour was used to construct a 2.5-mile-long (4.0 km) (approximately) brick boundary wall, generally 8 feet (2.4 m) high. In 1804 this wall was raised to 20 feet (6.1 m) near the Plumstead road, and to 15 feet (4.6 m) in other parts. (The first boundary wall had been built in 1702, prior to which the Warren had operated on open ground.)

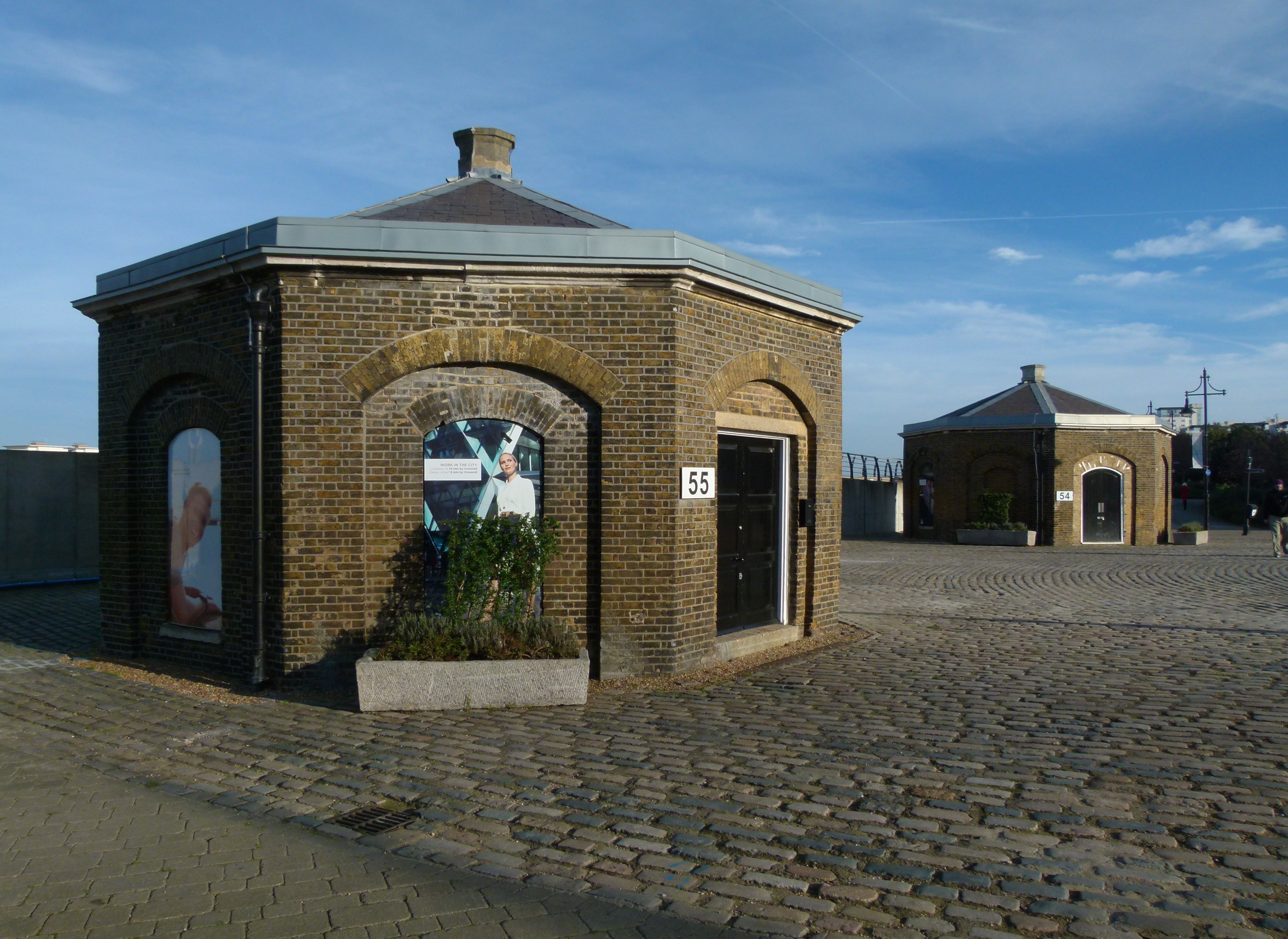
The riverside guard rooms (1815) flanked a grand set of steps in the newly built wharf, which became the principal point of entry from the river

Use of convict labour was key to this period of expansion. It was used to construct a huge new wharf, completed in 1813, and then again in 1814–1816 to dig a canal (the Ordnance Canal), which formed the eastern boundary of the site.

Guardhouses were built at points on the perimeter, manned by troops of the Royal Artillery; one at the main gate (1787–1788) and a pair by the new wharf (1814–1815) are still in place today. The River Thames was key to the Warren and its operations from the earliest days. A dock was built as part of the rebuilt wharf to facilitate loading and unloading from ships (it was supplemented in 1856 by the first in a series of substantial piers). The canal, as well as forming a boundary, provided access for barges; these were initially used to deliver timber to the heart of the carriage-building department and later provided a transit route for guns and explosives.

== 19th century: The Arsenal ==
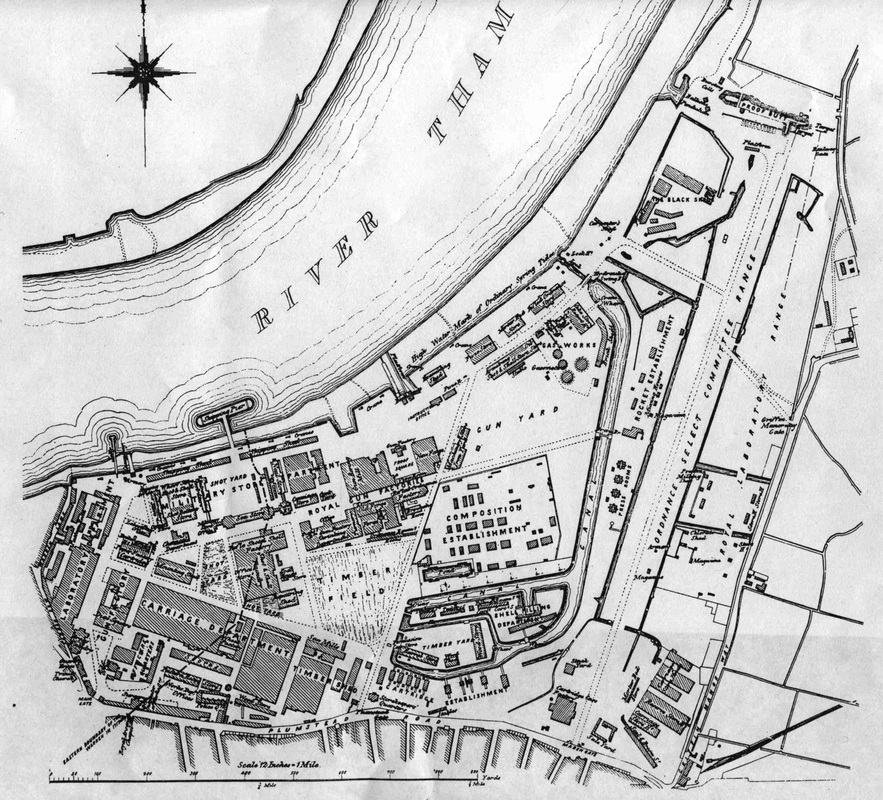
Map of the Royal Arsenal, 1867

In 1805, at the suggestion of King George III, the entire complex became known as the Royal Arsenal; its constituent elements retained their independence, however.

=== Expansion during the Napoleonic Wars ===
The Napoleonic Wars prompted an increase of activity at the Arsenal, which affected all areas of its operation.

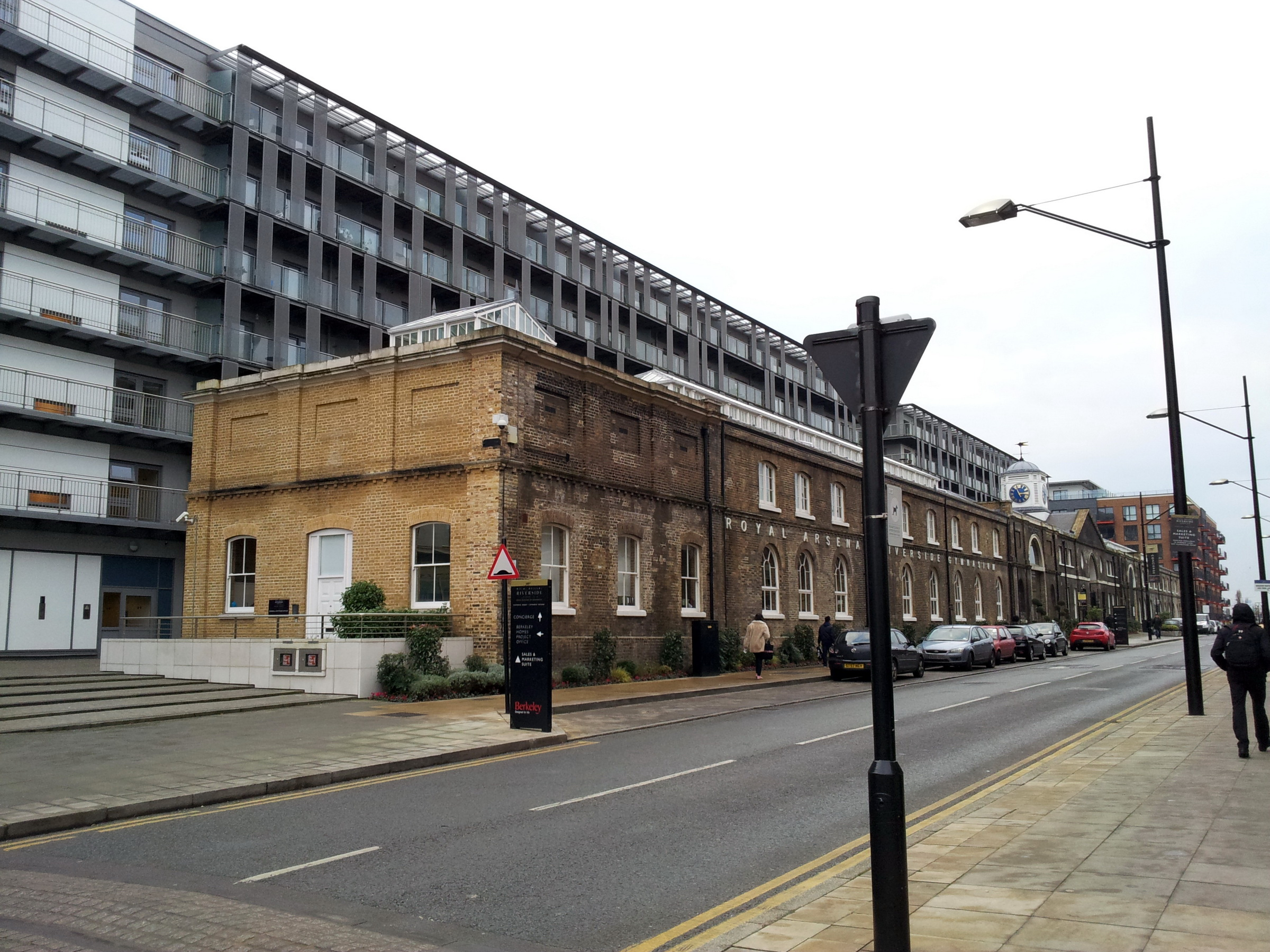
Built 1803–05, the exterior of the Royal Carriage Works now contains modern apartments (2014)

In 1803–1805 a substantial Royal Carriage Factory was built (on the site of New Carriage Square, which had been destroyed by fire - possibly arson - the previous year). Its outer walls, complete with a contemporary chiming clock, survive; within, where there are now new apartment blocks, there was once a vast engineering and manufacturing complex staffed by wheelwrights, carpenters, blacksmiths and metalworkers. It was here that steam power first came to be used in the Arsenal, when Joseph Bramah installed his patented planing machine in 1805.

The Arsenal was soon a renowned centre of excellence in mechanical engineering, with notable engineers including Samuel Bentham, Marc Isambard Brunel and Henry Maudslay employed there. Brunel was responsible for erecting the steam sawmills, part of the Royal Carriage Department; Maudslay later expanded this buying more steam machinery. The Arsenal also became a noted research facility, developing several key advances in armament design and manufacture. One example was the innovative Congreve Rocket, designed and (from 1805) manufactured on site by William Congreve (son of the Comptroller of the Royal Laboratory). Thenceforward rocket manufacture became a key activity, carried out in purpose-built premises on the eastern edge of the site.

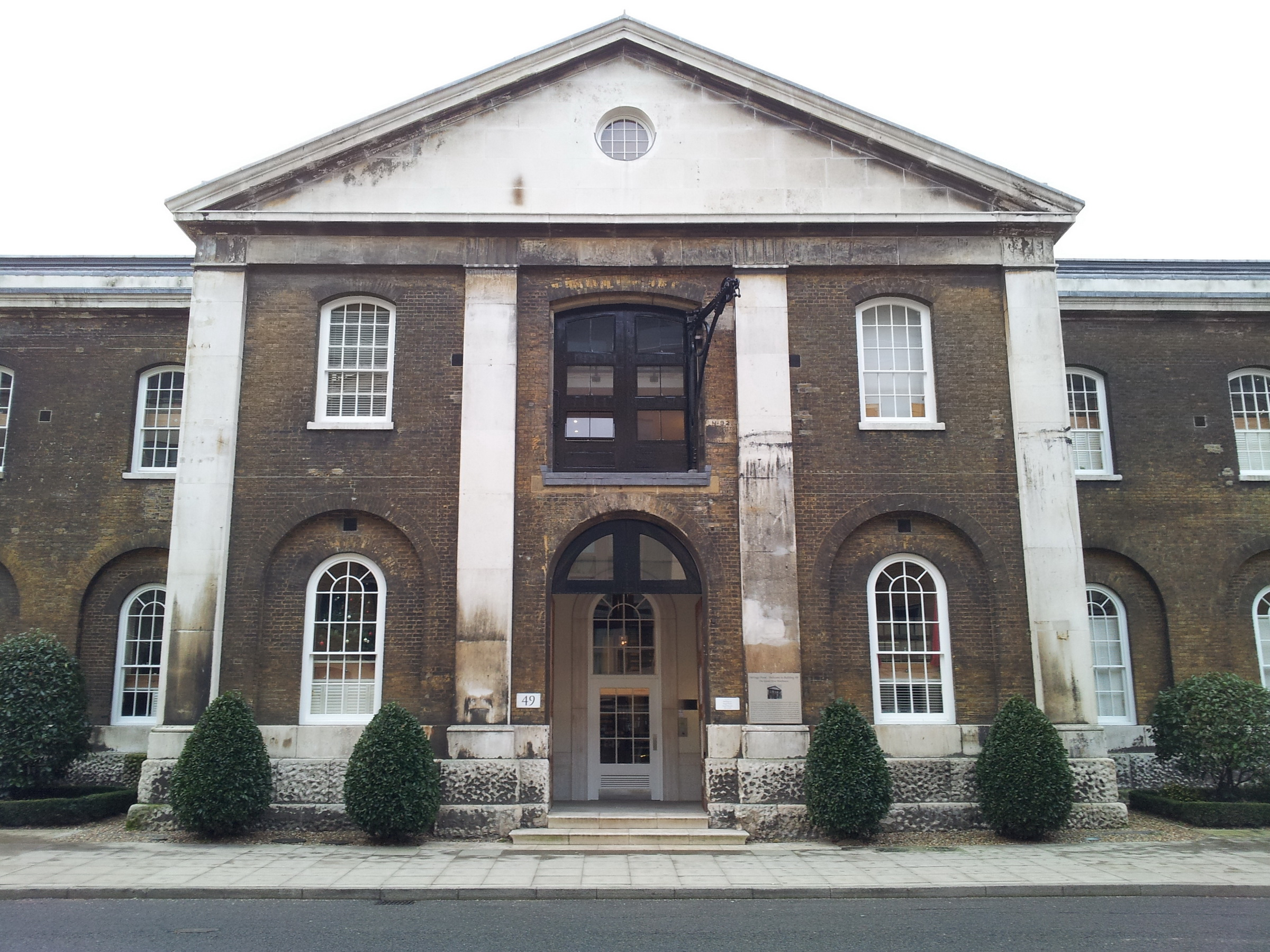
Part of the early 19th-century Grand Store complex (2014)

Between 1805 and 1813 the massive Grand Stores complex was constructed alongside new wharves by the river; though celebrated as a landmark of size and dignity befitting the Arsenal, the buildings were immediately, and for many years afterwards, vulnerable to subsidence due to their proximity to the river (this was caused in no small part by on-site supervisors directing the use of cheaper wooden piles in place of the stone foundations specified by the architect, James Wyatt). The buildings formed a three-sided quadrangle of warehouses facing the river, with the central open space used as a shot-yard. (The main range of buildings was flanked by smaller quadrangles to the east and west, only fragments of which survive.) The Grand Store was not uniquely, or even primarily, designed as an artillery store, but rather as warehousing for all kinds of military equipment: an early example of a planned integrated military stores complex.

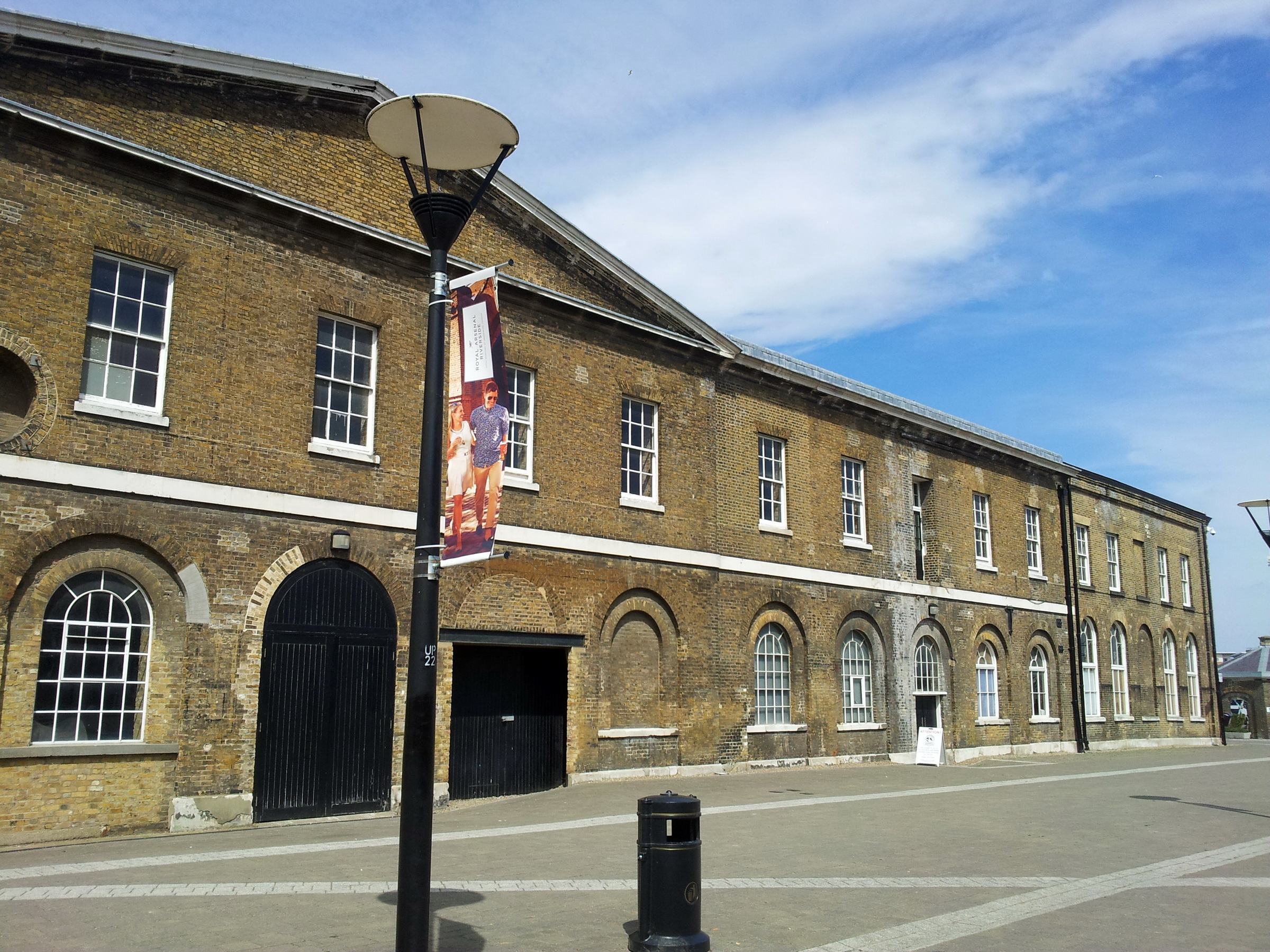
New Laboratory Square: the east range of 1808 (2015)

From 1808, "New Laboratory Square" began to be developed to the north of the original Laboratory complex, with an open-sided quadrangle built around an eighteenth-century Naval storehouse; initially used for storage, it came to be used for manufacturing from the 1850s. (It replaced the 'East Laboratory', a quadrangle of buildings which had been demolished to make way for the Grand Store.) Earlier, in 1804, subsidiary Royal Laboratories were set up in the Dockyard towns of Portsmouth and Devonport and in Upnor Castle near Chatham. The Devonport Laboratory (on Mount Wise) had been converted into barracks by 1834 but ten years later Portsmouth's (which had been overtaken by dockyard expansion) was relocated to Priddy's Hard, where manufacture (initially of small arms ammunition, later of shells and fuzes) continued, overseen from Woolwich.

Proof work continued at this time. In 1803 a burst gun caused damage to nearby buildings, which prompted construction of a new set of proof butts further to the east; these opened (on what would later be the site of the Arsenal's gasworks) in 1808. Starting in 1811, a project was begun to raise the ground level of the eastern part of the Arsenal site, as far as the canal, using material dredged from the river bed (a huge undertaking, which took nine years to complete). Also in 1811, a further 20 acres of marshland to the east was purchased, with a view to re-siting the gunnery range (so as to make room for the new sawmills); a 1,250-yard range was then built. In 1838, however, it was accepted that (due to improved ballistics) a much longer range was required; this would require multiple land purchases (at great expense), but was eventually achieved in 1855 when a 3,000-yard range was opened. At the same time, new proof butts were constructed alongside the range.

==== Peacetime contraction ====
Levels of arms manufacture naturally ebbed during the relatively peaceful years after the Battle of Waterloo; between 1815 and 1835 the size of the workforce shrank from 5,000 to 500 (not including military personnel and convicts). At the same time, the Arsenal fell behind the pace of technological change. In the early 1840s, Scottish engineering pioneer James Nasmyth toured the site and described it as a 'museum of technical antiquity'. Nasmyth was subsequently engaged to help modernize the complex, but it was only when Britain was on the brink of war that the pace of mechanization increased until, by 1857 (within the space of a decade), the Arsenal had 2,773 specialized machines at work powered by 68 stationary steam engines. A similar pattern of development was seen at the other Board of Ordnance manufacturing sites: the Royal Small Arms Factory, Enfield and the Royal Gun Powder Factory, Waltham Abbey.

=== Crimean War: mechanisation and innovation ===
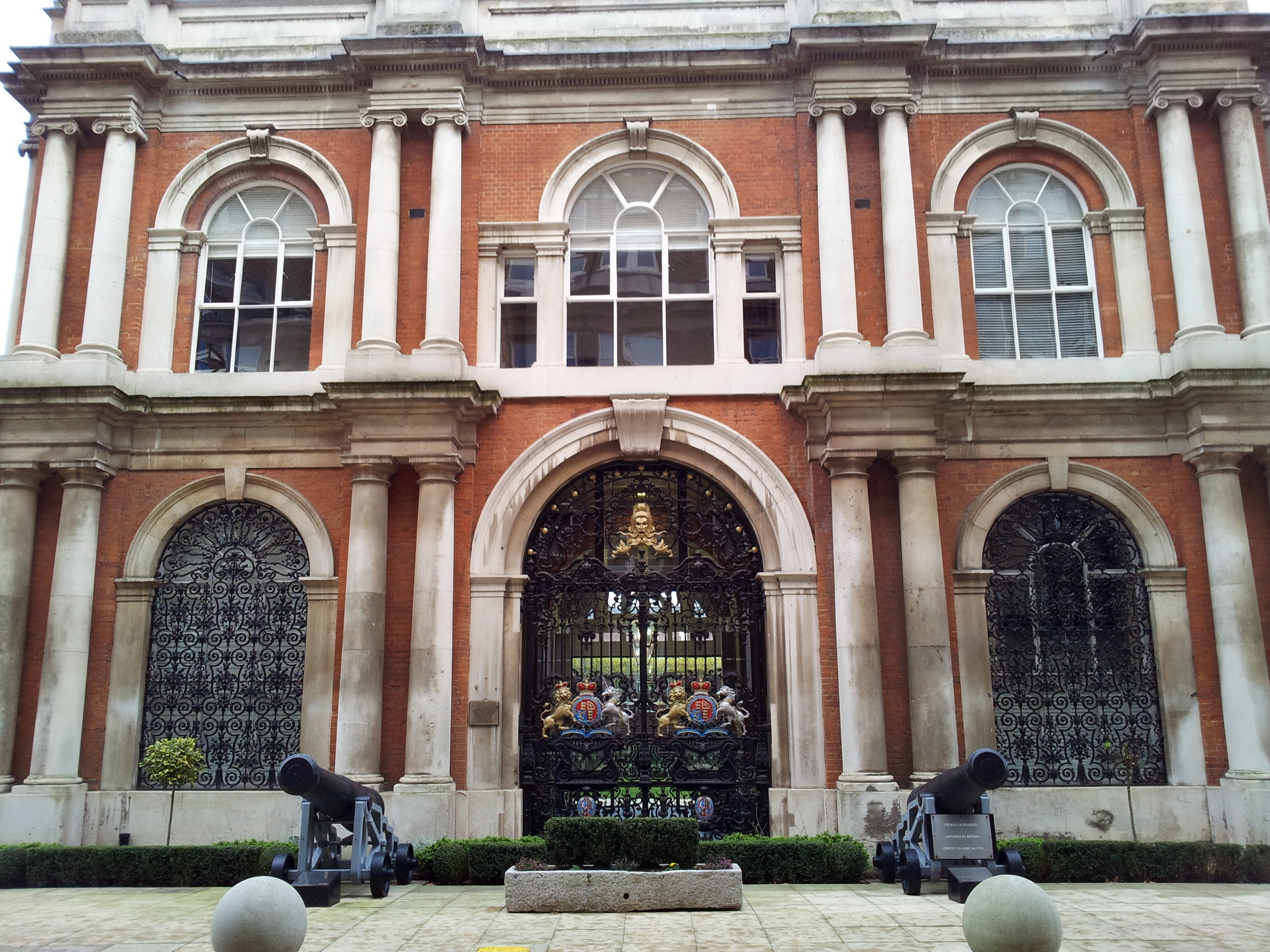
The gatehouse: all that remains of the 1856 Shot and Shell Foundry (2014)

By 1854, the old Laboratory Square had been roofed over to serve as a vast machine shop at the heart of what was now a munitions factory. The open spaces of the Royal Carriage Works were similarly roofed over and mechanised, and the area of its operations expanded; its carpenters and wheelwrights were moved out into new workshops (which later developed into what is now Gunnery House) east of the main building. (This area had previously been used for the storage and seasoning of the timber used for building the gun carriages.) The building of a new Shot and Shell Foundry, an addition to the Royal Laboratory completed in 1856, enabled manufacture of the latest types of ammunition; this huge complex covered the whole of what is now Wellington Park, and later expanded further to the east.

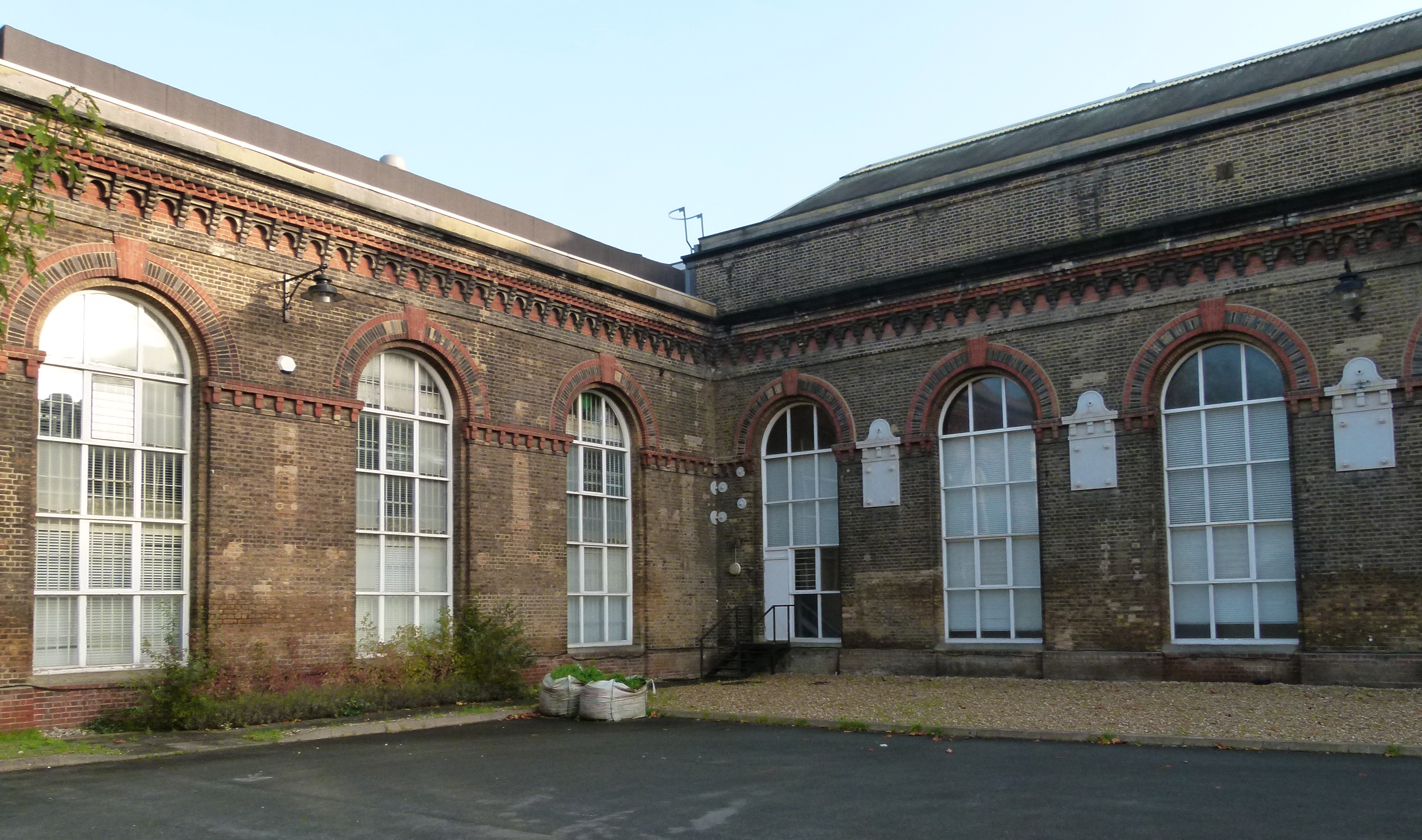
Part of the former Iron Foundry (aka Armstrong Gun Factory) now known as Cannon House (2015)

The Royal Brass Foundry was renamed the Royal Gun Factory in 1855, and its workshops expanded into the Great Pile (Dial Arch) quadrangles. For the first time it diversified into manufacture of iron cannons (which had previously always been commissioned from private contractors); for this it developed a new and much larger foundry complex (on the far side of the Shot and Shell Foundry) which was completed in 1857. The new foundry building, which still stands, was subdivided into three sections (for moulding, casting and trimming) and complemented by a separate forge and boring mill. The early years of its work were defined by famed arms manufacturer William George Armstrong, who in 1859 made his patented designs for rifled ordnance available for government use; (the Arsenal had previously been unable to replicate its effectiveness in-house). He was duly rewarded with a knighthood and the part-time position of Superintendent of the Royal Gun Factory at Woolwich; after further expansion of the factory complex he resigned in 1863 following the demonstration of an even more powerful rifled gun by his rival Sir Joseph Whitworth.

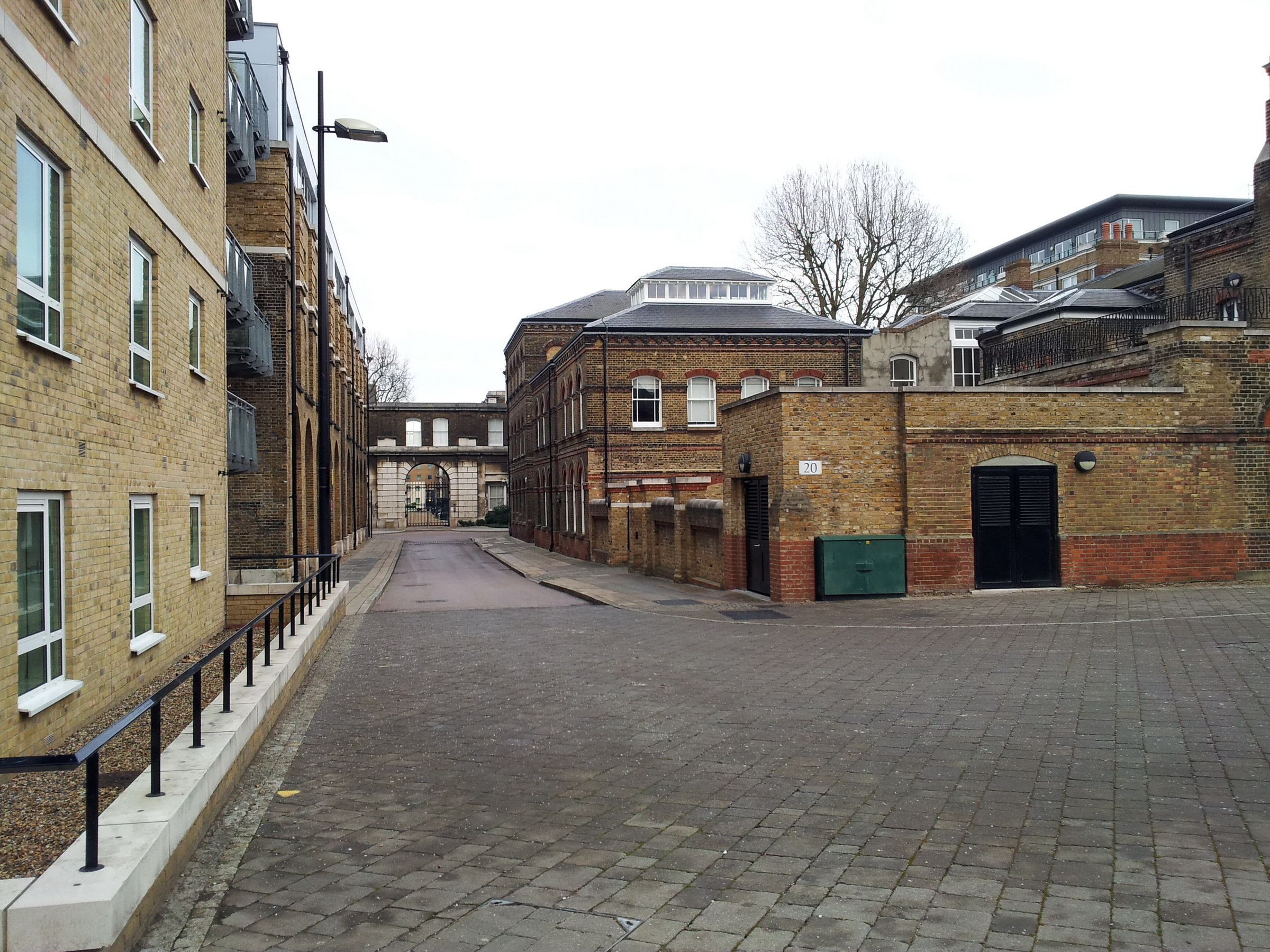
Abel's Laboratory, Building 20

As part of the preparations for the Crimean War (1854–1856), Frederick Abel (later Sir Frederick Abel) had been appointed the first War Department Chemist with the aim of investigating the new chemical explosives which were then being developed. He was mostly responsible for bringing guncotton into safe use and for winning a patent dispute brought by Alfred Nobel against the British Government over the patent rights to cordite which Abel had jointly developed with Professor James Dewar. A new Chemical Laboratory was built to Abel's requirements; this was numbered Building 20. Abel was also responsible for the technical management of the Royal Gunpowder Factory. He retired from the Royal Arsenal in 1888.

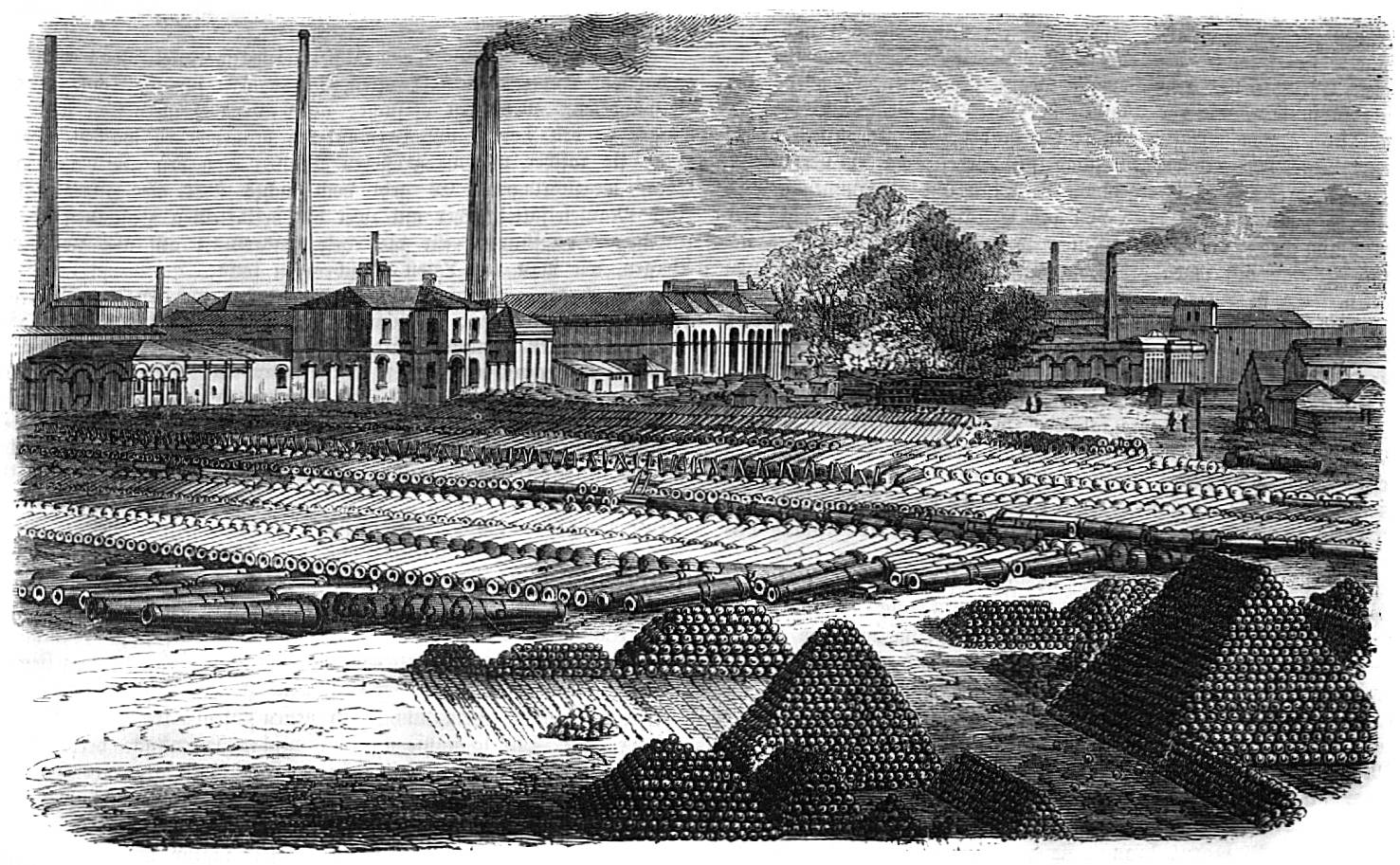
A view of the Arsenal in 1858; guns and shot continued to be stored in the open until the 20th century

1854 saw the installation of a retort house for what would become the Royal Arsenal's Gas Works, which was established close to what was then the north-east corner of the site, just west of the canal. Its superintendent additionally had charge of all hydraulic equipment (lifts, cranes etc.) in use around the Arsenal site (other than that used directly in the process of manufacturing); a pair of hydraulic accumulator towers were built within the eastern outer quadrangle of the Grand Store in 1855 (replacing parts of the building demolished due to subsidence twenty years earlier), which drove machinery throughout the adjacent stores complex.

==== Demise of the Ordnance Board ====
In the wake of the Crimean War there was widespread criticism of several aspects of Britain's military command. The Board of Ordnance, much criticised for inefficiency, was disbanded in 1855, and the War Office then took over responsibility for the Arsenal and all its activities. A Military Stores Department was established, with its headquarters in the Arsenal's Grand Store. The manufacturing departments were mostly left to their own devices, though the Ordnance Select Committee (initially set up to assess the merits of the Armstrong Gun) took some responsibility for overseeing ongoing research and development; it and its successors were given Verbruggen's House to serve as offices and a board room from 1859. The same period also saw a shift in guard duties and policing on the site – from 1843 these were shared between the Royal Artillery and a detachment from R (Greenwich) Division of the Metropolitan Police, with the Metropolitan Police taking over such duties completely in 1861 with the formation of a devoted No. 1 (Woolwich Arsenal) Division.

=== After Crimea ===
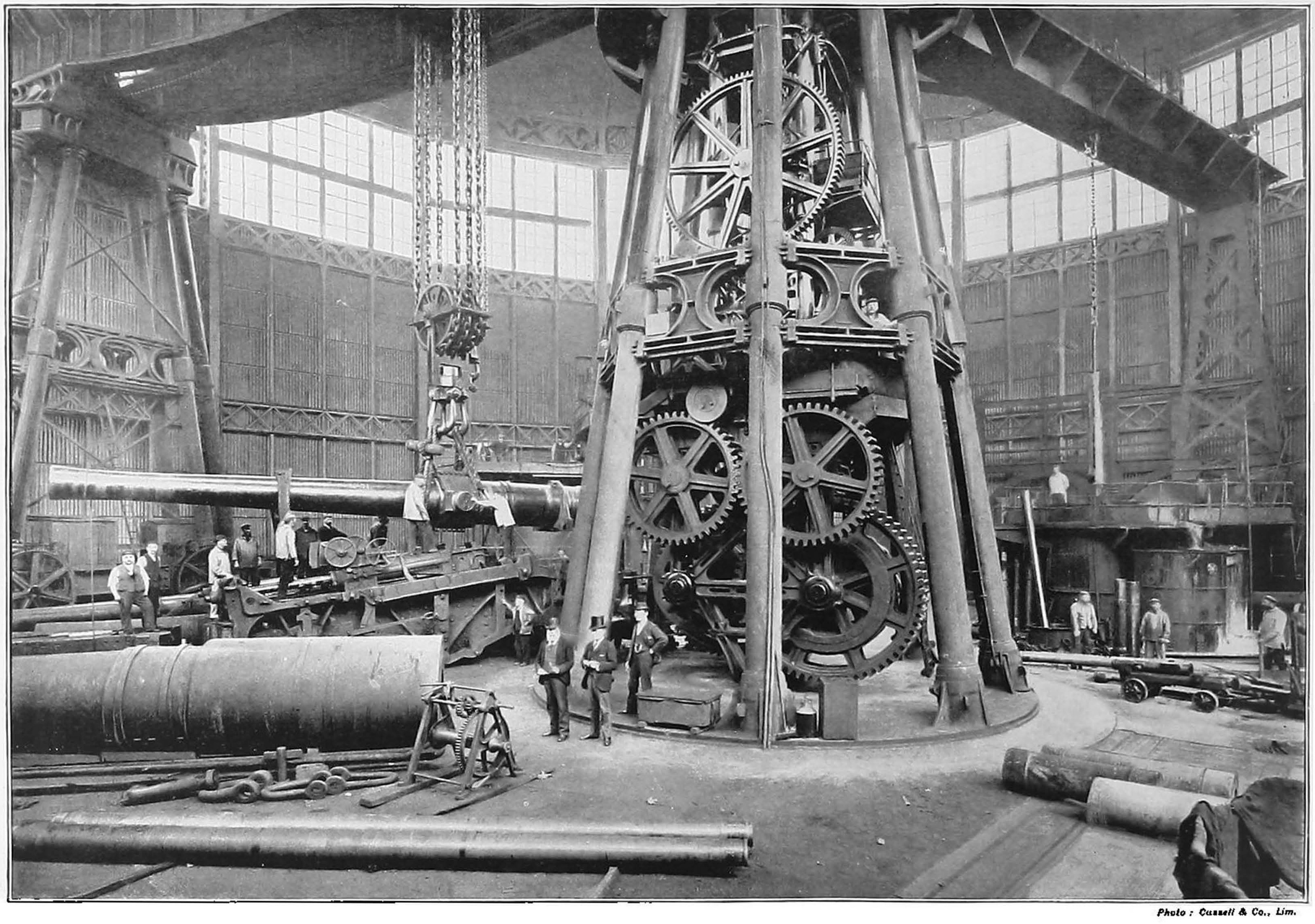
The "great crane" of 1876, photographed c.1888; part of the Royal Gun Factory

As had happened earlier in the century, the wartime expansion of the 1850s was followed by spending cuts, and workforce contraction, in the 1860s. Twenty years later, though, the Arsenal began to grow again as investment in weaponry research and manufacture resumed. The narrow-gauge Royal Arsenal Railway was opened in 1873, complemented later by a standard-gauge network connected to the main line. Electricity arrived in the Arsenal in the 1870s; initially used for lighting, it was soon used to power all kinds of machinery. An on-site power station was opened (on the site of the east quadrangle of the Grand Store) in 1896.

==== Mechanical and managerial developments ====
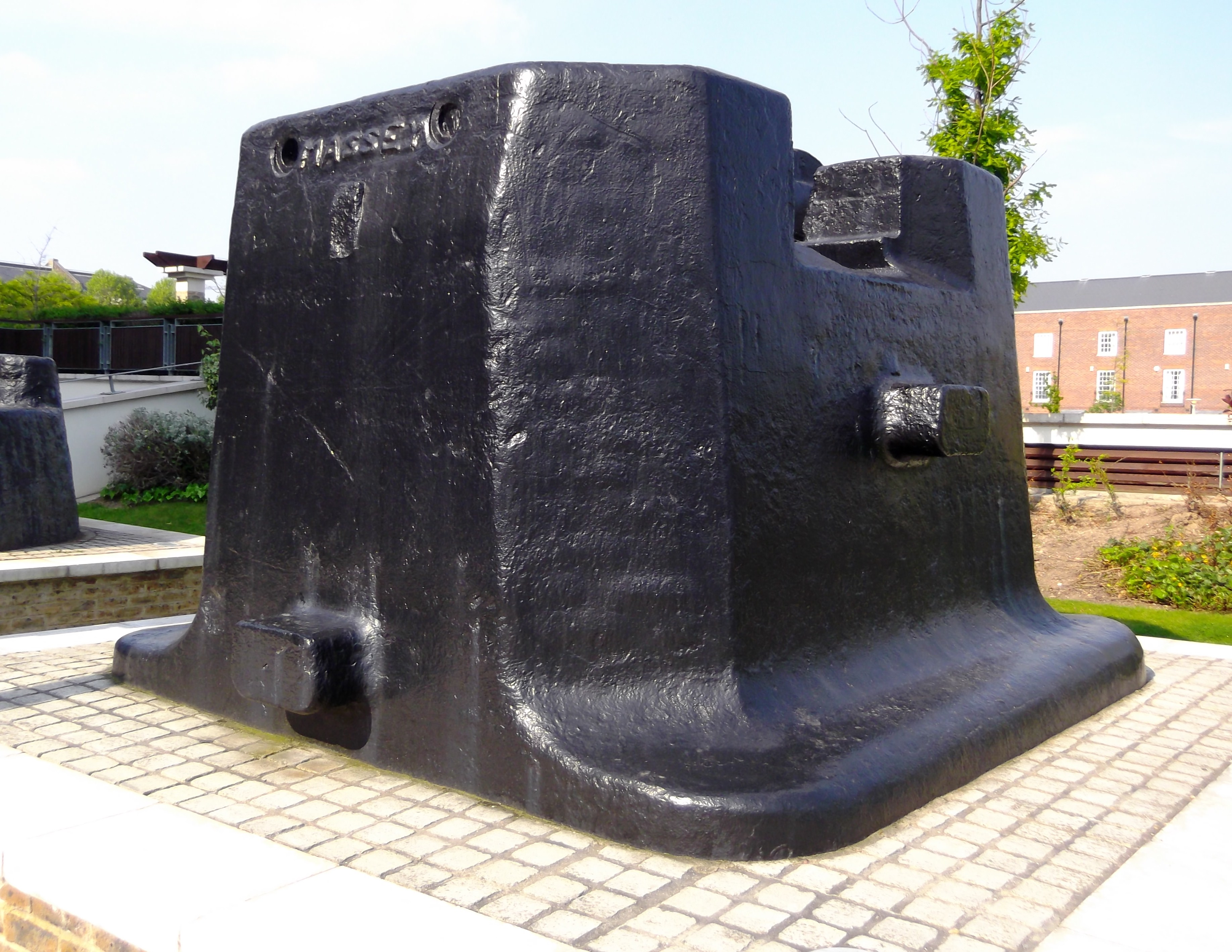
A 103-ton anvil, cast on-site in 1873 and formerly used in the rolling mill, is preserved by Wellington Park

The Arsenal was still made up of separate divisions. The manufacturing departments (which soon came to be called Ordnance Factories) were each overseen by a (largely independent) Superintendent (who answered directly to the Director of Artillery and Stores): the Royal Laboratory continued to use hundreds of lathes to manufacture ammunition (including bullets, shrapnel shells, fuzes, percussion caps, as well as shot and shells); the Royal Carriage Department continued to build gun carriages, with metal fast replacing wood for this purpose; and the Royal Gun Factory expanded still further, with a new rolling mill and associated boiler house and forge being erected in the early 1870s, and a huge boring-mill ten years later. Tentative moves toward the manufacture of steel guns were made at this time, though these were mainly sourced from outside contractors; it was not till the turn of the century that iron gun manufacture finally ceased in the Arsenal.

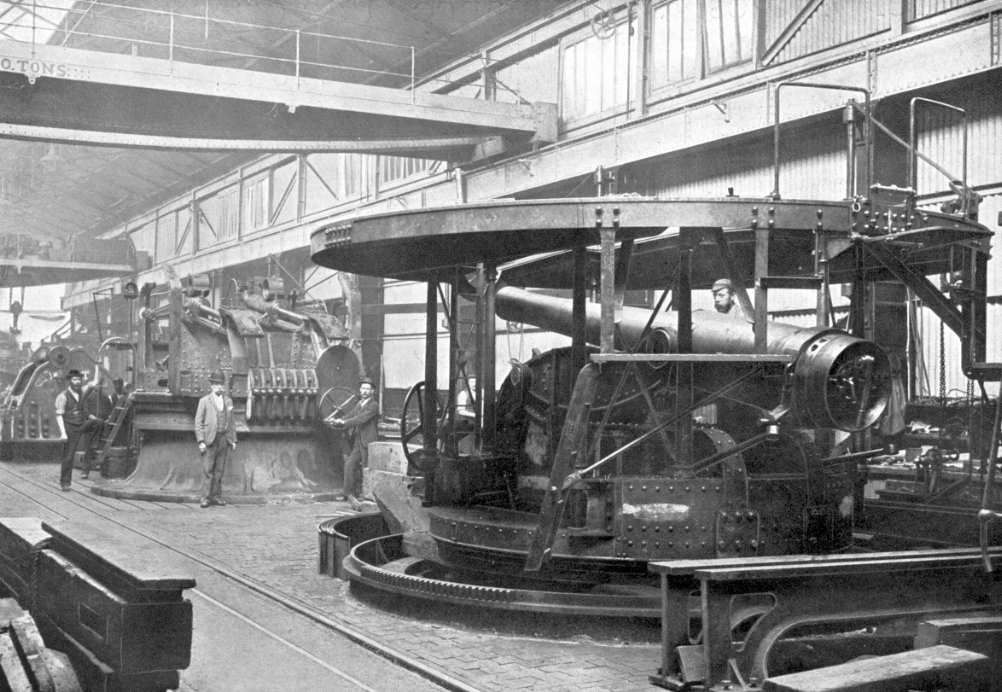
Inside the Royal Carriage Works c.1896 (BL 6" guns)

Each Factory was responsible for the initial design and final inspection of items, as well as for the intervening manufacturing process. Once completed, all items manufactured on site passed to the Ordnance Store Department, overseen by the Commissary-General of Ordnance (successor to the Storekeepers of old). He had oversight of one of the world's largest depots for military equipment (following the closure of Woolwich Dockyard in 1869 its site had been given over to serve the department as a storage depot); he also had a degree of seniority across the Arsenal as a whole, being responsible for receiving orders from the Director of Artillery and Stores and disseminating them across the departments.

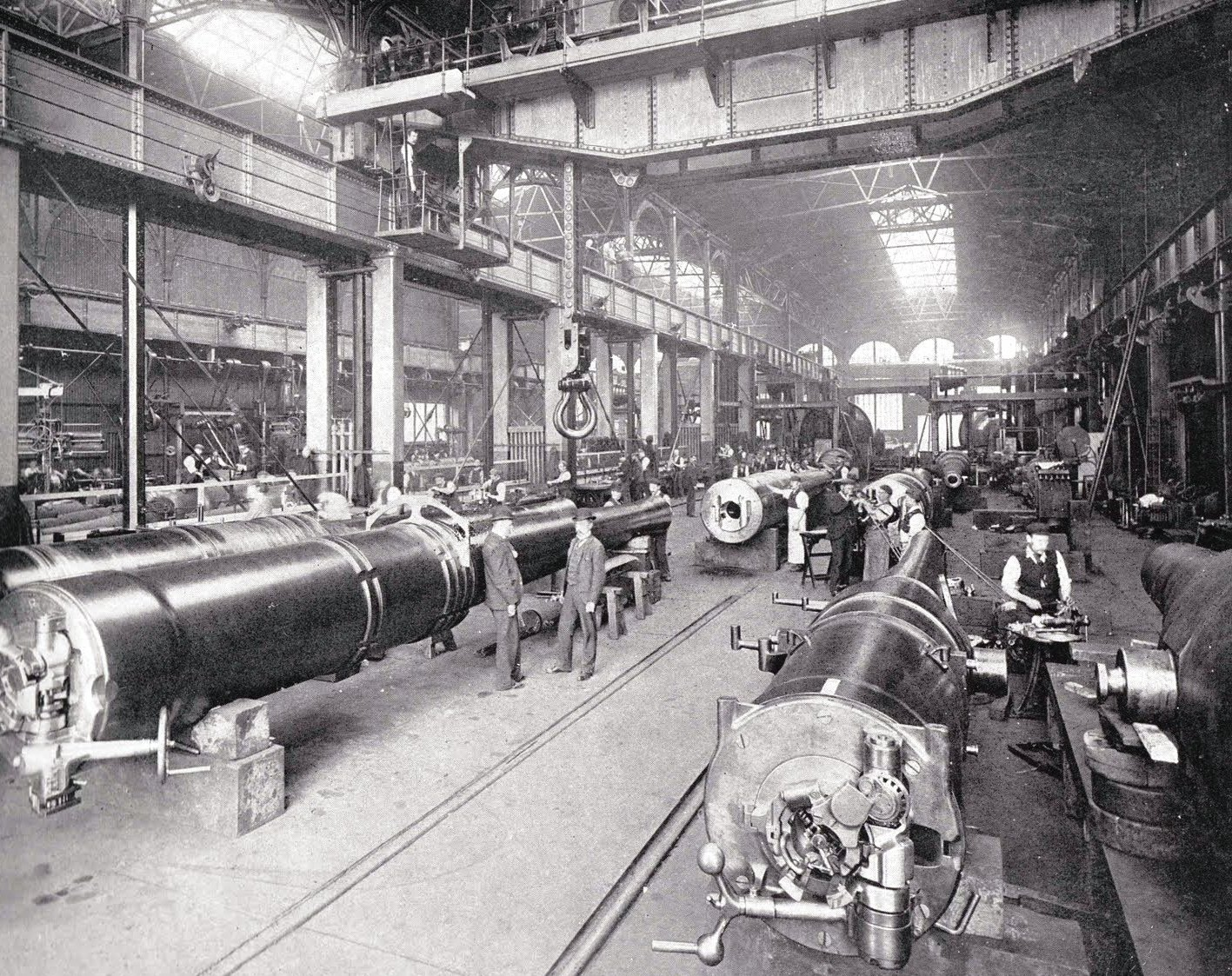
The South Boring Mill in 1897

The three Ordnance Factories guarded their autonomy and resisted efforts made to place them under a single command (the appointment in 1868 of a Brigadier-General with the title 'Director-General of Ordnance and Commandant of the Royal Arsenal' was an initiative which lasted only two years). Since ammunition, guns and carriages had to function together, this lack of co-ordination and communication between the departments that manufactured them inevitably caused problems, at a time when the Arsenal was in any case facing criticism for high levels of wasteful expenditure. An 1886 committee of enquiry, under the chairmanship of the Earl of Morley, laid bare these shortcomings and made a number of recommendations, leading among other things to the (civilian) appointment of Sir William Anderson as Director-General of Ordnance Factories (the post was retitled Chief Superintendent of Ordnance Factories, following Anderson's death, in 1899). A key recommendation was for clear managerial separation between the manufacturing departments and those responsible for inspection and approval of their products, which resulted in the establishment of a separate Inspection department under a Chief Inspector of Armaments.

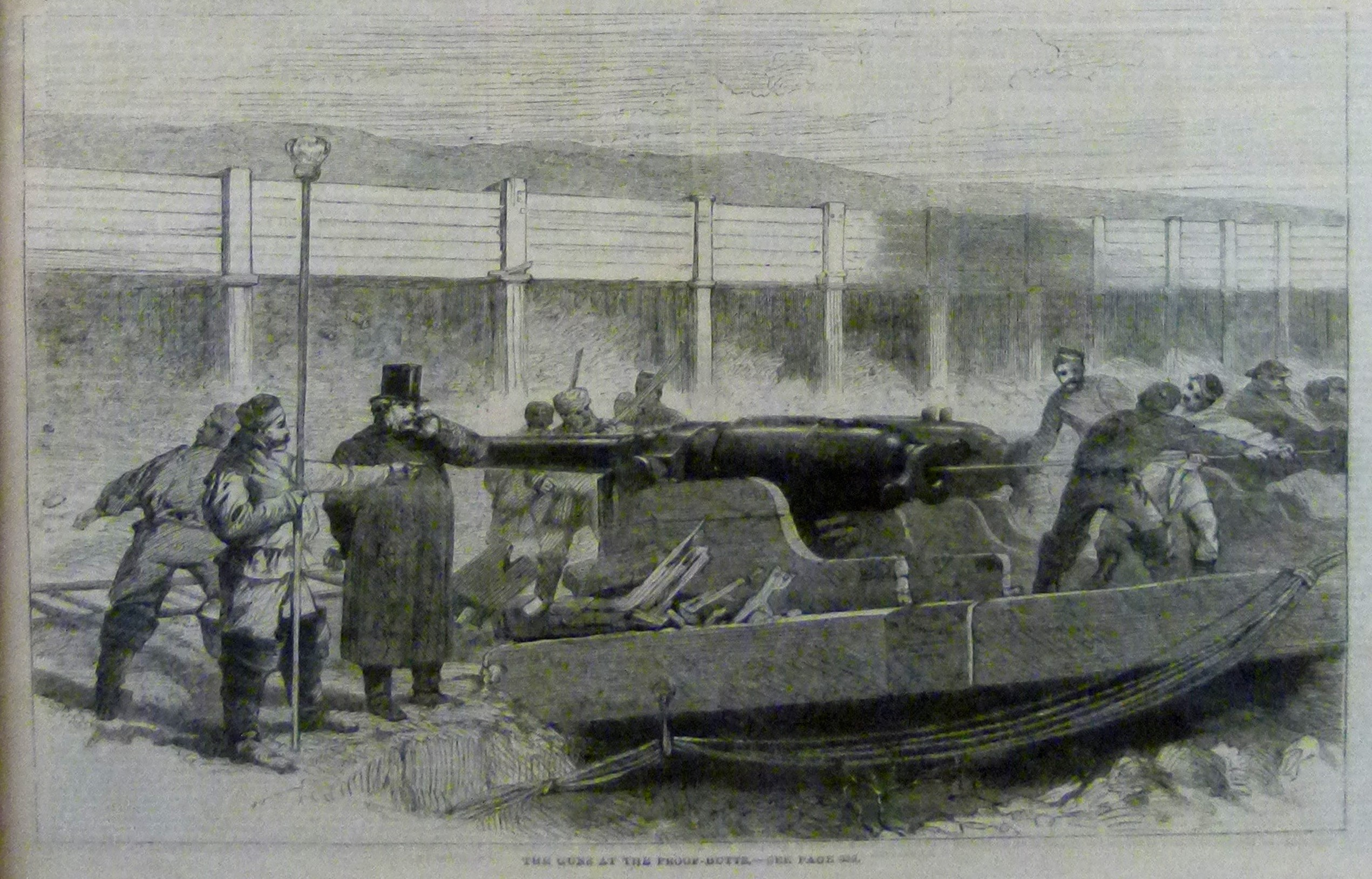
Testing an Armstrong Gun at the Proof Butts, 1862.

In 1887 the Proof Butts were relocated once again (for the last time) further to the east. Four bays were built, to which a further four were added in 1895. Each bay consisted of a concrete box (25 ft wide by 20 ft high and 70 ft deep, two-thirds filled with sand) open towards the gun position, which was around 500 yards away. (The design was much as it had been in previous centuries, except in concrete rather than wood.) Guns were brought into position using a gantry crane, and various instruments measured velocity and other variables. Further bays, with railway mountings for the guns, would be added during the First World War, by which time the area and its operation was known as the Proof and Experimental Establishment.

Recognising the increasing divergence of naval gun design from that of land artillery, part of the Ordnance Store Department was separated off in 1891 to form an independent Naval Ordnance Store Department, which (from its headquarters in the Arsenal) had oversight of what were soon termed Royal Naval Ordnance Depôts (later RN Armament Depots), including RNAD Woolwich: an extensive storage facility within the Arsenal itself.

==== Social and sporting activities ====
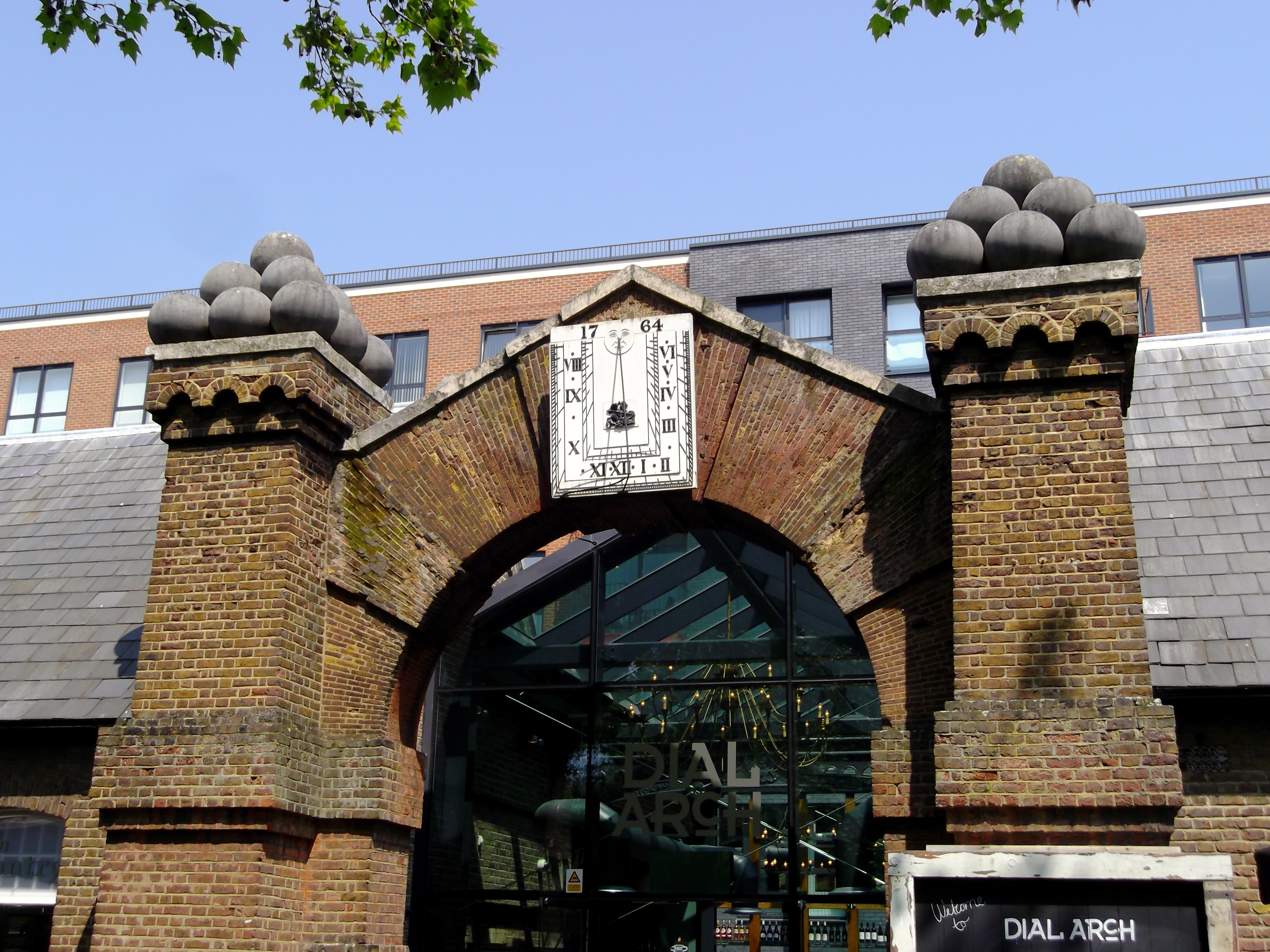
Dial Square (1718–20) lent its name to what became Arsenal Football Club

In 1868 twenty workers at the Arsenal formed a food-buying association operating from a house in Plumstead and named it the Royal Arsenal Co-operative Society. Over the next 115 years the enterprise grew to half a million members across London and beyond, providing services including funerals, housing, libraries and insurance.

In 1886 workers at the Arsenal formed a football club initially known as Dial Square after the workshops in the heart of the complex, playing their first game on 11 December (a 6–0 victory over Eastern Wanderers) in the Isle of Dogs. Renamed Royal Arsenal two weeks later (and also known as the 'Woolwich Reds'), the club entered the professional football league as Woolwich Arsenal in 1893 and later became known as Arsenal F.C., having moved to north London in 1913. Royal Ordnance Factories F.C. were another successful team set up by the Royal Arsenal but only lasted until 1896.

== 20th century: The Royal Ordnance Factories ==
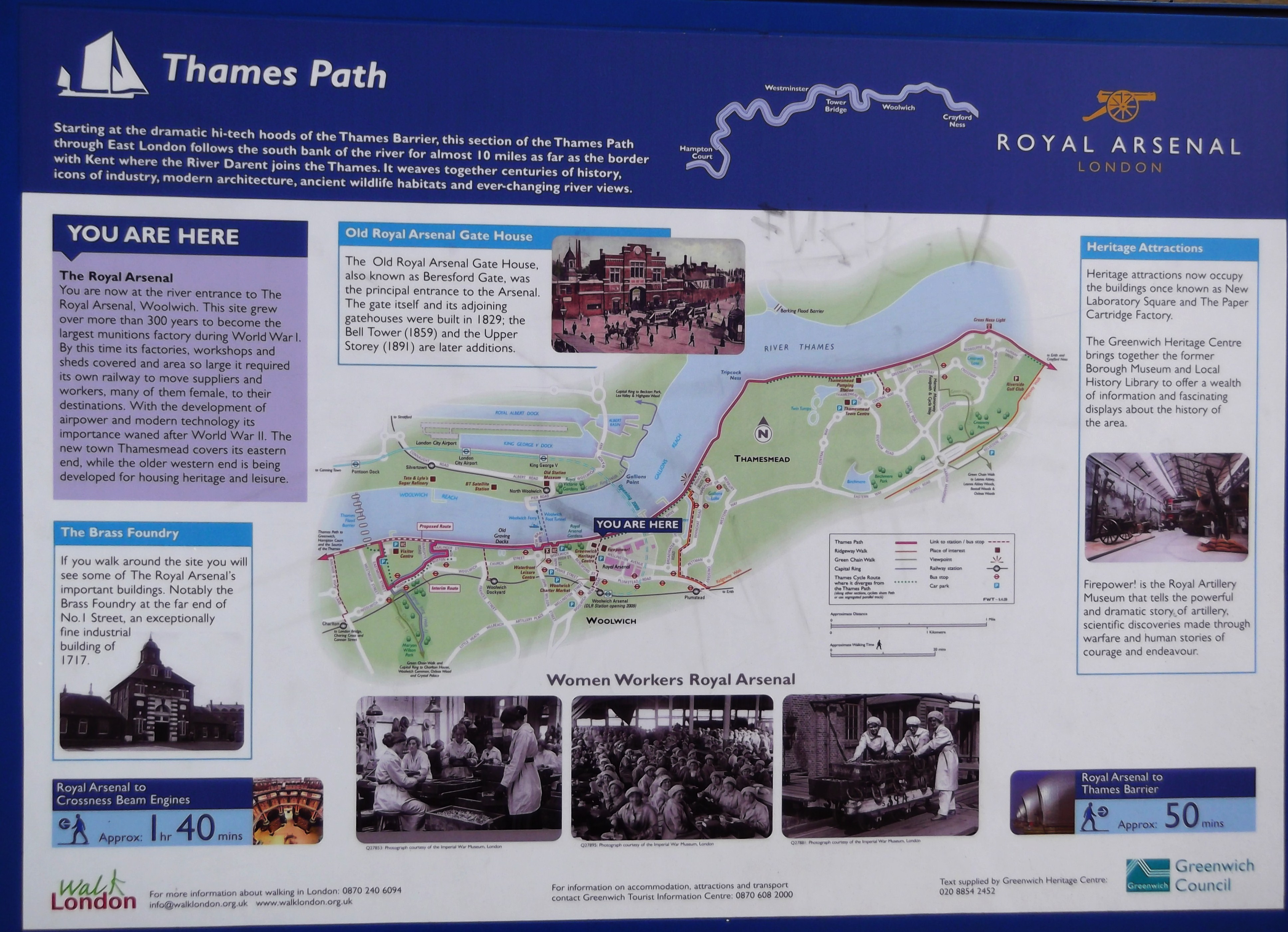
An information panel on the Thames Path indicates the one-time extent of the site over what is now Thamesmead

Further enlargement was to follow, and on an unprecedented scale; by the 20th century, though, there was little room for further development on site, so the Arsenal had to expand its area eastwards outside its brick boundary wall onto the Plumstead Marshes. The eastern portion of the Arsenal site had long been used for the more dangerous manufacturing processes, as well as for proof testing. This pattern continued, with the Composition Establishment (where assembly of cartridges, fuzes and other items took place) being moved east of the canal and a lyddite factory being established by the river. Later, much of the area of Plumstead and Erith Marshes was scattered with storage magazines for explosive materials, each in its own walled, moated and earth-traversed enclosure. Manufacture of Whitehead torpedoes, begun in the Arsenal in 1871 (with the canal used as a testing run for a time) was moved to Greenock in 1911.

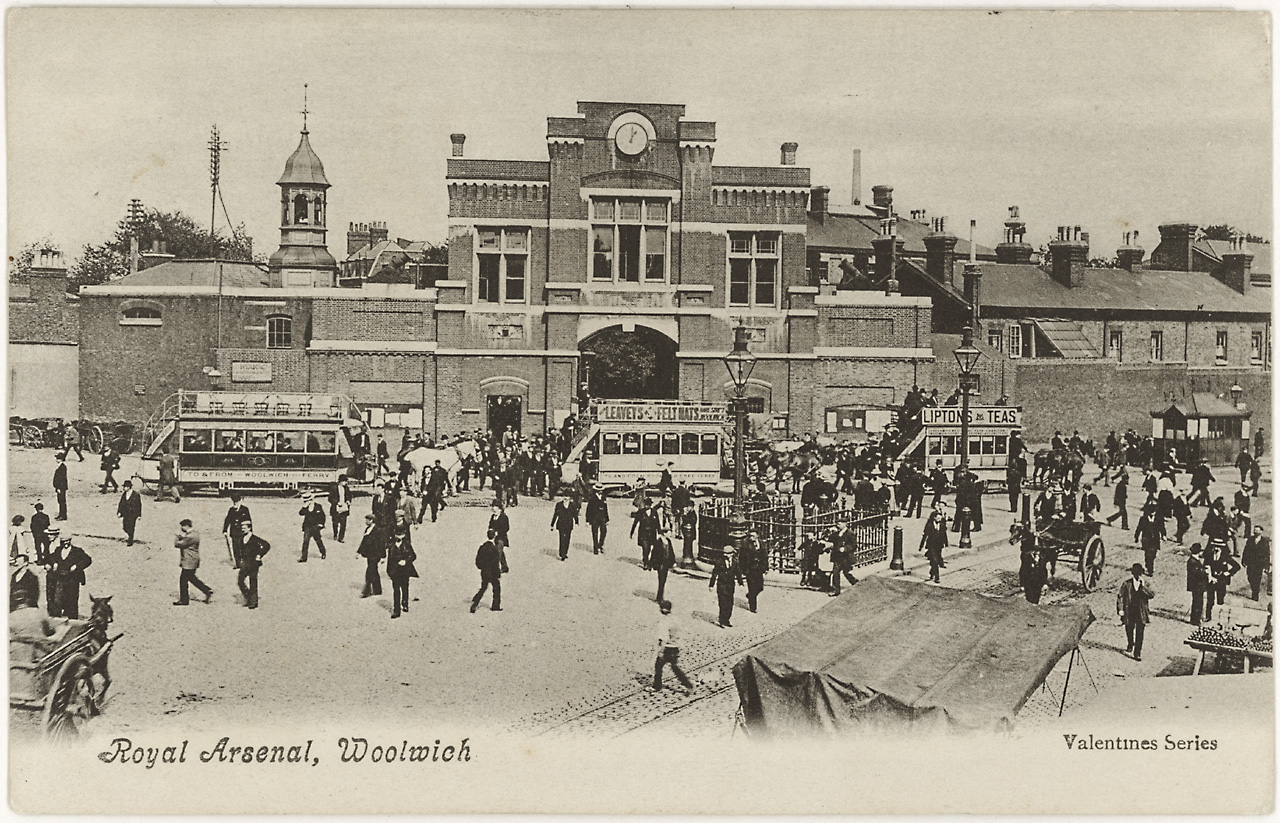
The Royal Arsenal Gatehouse at the turn of the century

Scientific research played an increasing role across the Arsenal from the early years of the 20th century: in 1902 an Experimental Establishment was set up to carry out research and investigations into explosives; (co-located with the Proof Butts, the two operations later combined to form the Proof and Experimental Establishment). At the same the staff of the War Department Chemist was expanded to strengthen its research capability; and over the next few years other small research departments emerged, focused on areas such as metallurgy, materials and mechanical technology. In 1907 these were all grouped together under a Superintendent of Research to form the Research Department.

=== First World War ===
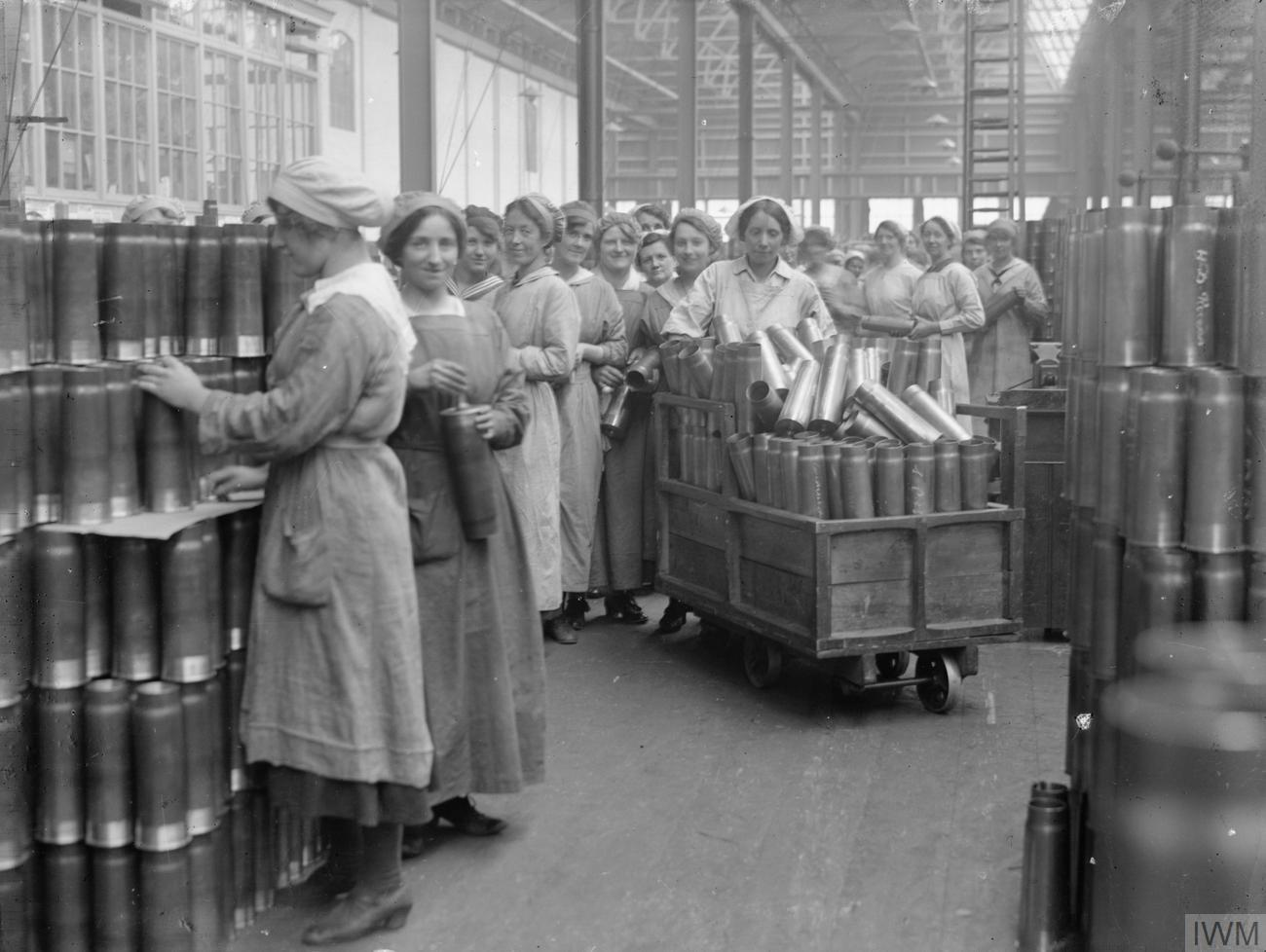
Women munition workers stacking cartridge cases in the New Case shop at the Royal Arsenal, 1918

At its peak, during the First World War, the Royal Arsenal extended over some 1,300 acres (530 ha) and employed around 80,000 people. The Royal Arsenal by then comprised the Royal Gun & Carriage Factory (which had amalgamated under Colonel Capel Lofft Holden in 1907), the Royal Laboratory (which in 1922 split to form the Royal Ammunition Factory and the Royal Filling Factory) and separate Naval Ordnance and Army Ordnance Store Departments. Other divisions included the Research and Development Department and various Inspection departments set up in the wake of the Morley Report (including that of the Chief Chemical Inspector, Woolwich, successor to the War Department Chemist). The expansion was such that in 1915 the Government built an estate of 1,298 homes - later (1925) known as the Progress Estate - at Eltham to help accommodate the workforce.

In addition to the massive expansion of the Royal Ordnance Factories in the Arsenal, and of private munitions companies, other UK Government-owned National Explosives Factories and National Filling Factories were built during the First World War. All the National Factories closed at the end of the War, with only the Royal (munitions) Factories (at Woolwich, Enfield, and Waltham Abbey) remaining open through to the Second World War.

=== Inter-war years ===
During the quiet period after the end of the First World War, the Royal Arsenal built steam railway locomotives. It had an extensive standard gauge internal railway system, and this was connected to the North Kent Line just beyond Plumstead railway station. The Royal Arsenal also cast the Memorial Plaques given to the next-of-kin of deceased servicemen and servicewomen. In 1919 a committee was set up, under the chairmanship of Thomas McKinnon Wood, to report on the future organisation and role of the Royal Arsenal. One recommendation was for the establishment of an integrated Armament Design Office (up until then each factory had maintained its own, largely independent, drawing office). In 1921 a new Design Department duly came into being; based in the Central Offices building, it was a joint service body, responsible for initiating designs for guns, carriages, ammunition, small arms, tanks and transport vehicles, in close collaboration with the ordnance factories.

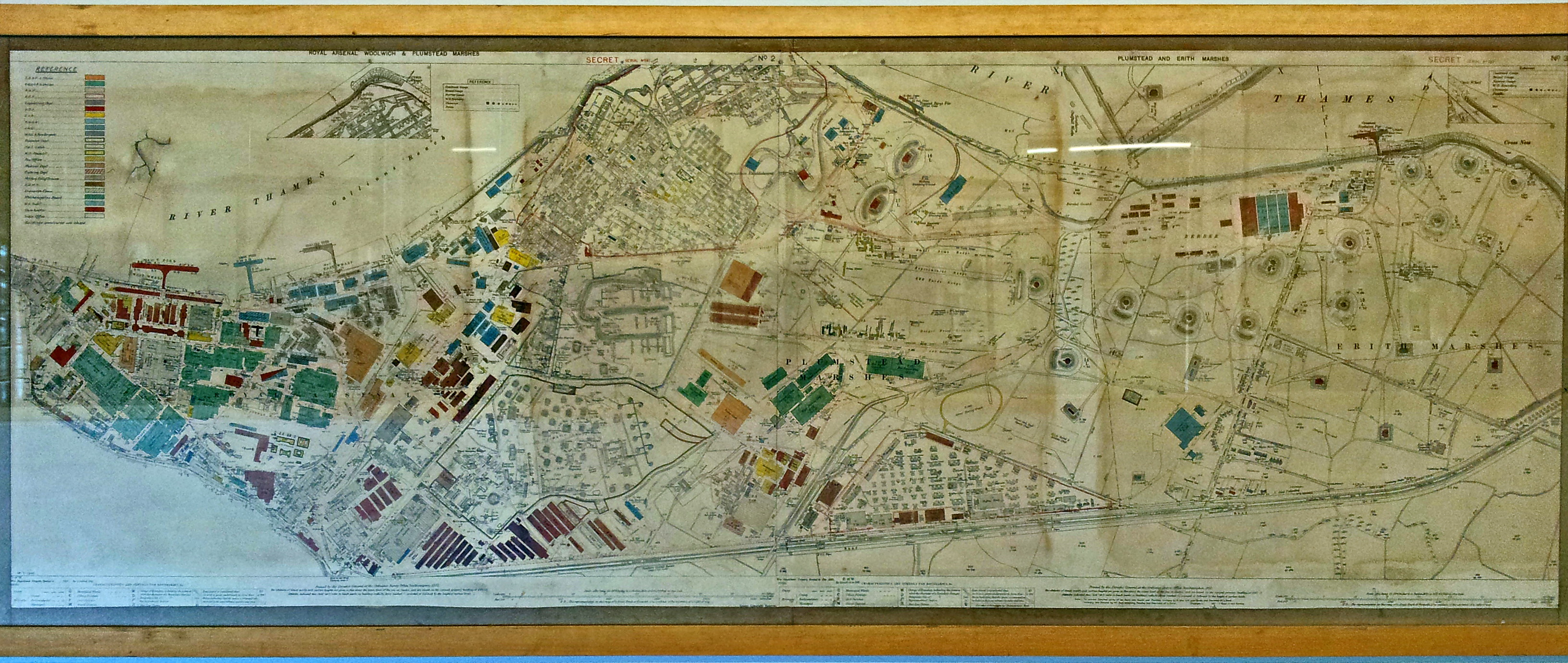
Colour-coded map showing the full extent of the Royal Arsenal in 1931. Buildings are coloured according to their department: green (Royal Gun & Carriage Factory), light grey (Royal Ammunition Factory), red (Army Ordnance Stores), blue (Royal Naval Armament Depot), dark grey (Engineering dept), yellow (Inspection dept) and light brown (Chief Superintendent of Ordnance Factories: central offices and stores). Parts of the central area are outlined in red (for the Royal Filling Factory), grey (Proof & Experimental Establishment) or brown (Research Establishment). To the east, isolated magazines and other 'danger buildings' are scattered across Plumstead and Erith Marshes.

On 1 January 1927 policing of the site was transferred from the Metropolitan Police to the new War Department Constabulary. The latter was renamed the Army Department Constabulary in 1964 and then merged into the Ministry of Defence Police in 1971, with these two bodies continuing to police the site until its closure. In 1935, the Ballistics branch of the Research Department began work on developing rockets for use as anti-aircraft weapons. To provide a more remote testing location, Fort Halstead in Kent was acquired by the War Office in 1937, initially serving as an outstation of the Arsenal. This went on to become the Projectile Development Establishment (it later relocated to Aberporth in Wales for the duration of the war).

The build-up to the Second World War started in the late 1930s. Abel's old Chemical Laboratory was by now too small and new Chemical Laboratories were built in 1937 on Frog Island, on a former loop in the Ordnance Canal. Staff from the Royal Arsenal helped design, and in some cases managed the construction of, many of the new Royal Ordnance Factories (ROFs) and the ROF Filling Factories. Much of the Royal Arsenal's former ordnance production was moved to these new sites, as it was considered vulnerable to aerial bombing from mainland Europe. The original plan was to replace the Royal Arsenal's Filling Factory with one at ROF Chorley and another at ROF Bridgend, but it was soon realised that many more ROFs would be needed. Just over forty had been established by the end of the war, nearly half of them Filling Factories, together with a similar number of explosives factories built and run by private companies, such as ICI's Nobels Explosives, but these private sector factories were not called ROFs.

=== Second World War ===
The Royal Arsenal was caught up in the Blitz on 7 September 1940. After several attacks, the fuze factory was destroyed and the filling factory and a light gun factory badly damaged. Explosive filling work ceased on the site, but the production of guns, shells, cartridge cases and bombs continued. In September 1940, prior to the raid, some 32,500 people worked there; but after the raid this dropped to 19,000. The numbers employed on site had increased by February 1943, with 23,000 employed, but by August 1945 were down to 15,000. 103 people were killed and 770 injured, during 25 raids, by bombs, V-1 flying bombs and V-2 rockets.

The Central Offices were also damaged in the raid, prompting the removal of the Design Department from Woolwich; by 1942 both it and the Research Department were accommodated at Fort Halstead (they remained there after the war, and would later merge to become the Armament Research and Development Establishment (ARDE)).

The staff of the Chemical Inspectorate, working with explosives, were evacuated in early September 1940. Shortly afterwards one of the Frog Island buildings was destroyed by bombing and another damaged. The laboratories were partially re-occupied in 1945 and fully re-occupied by 1949.

=== The final run-down ===
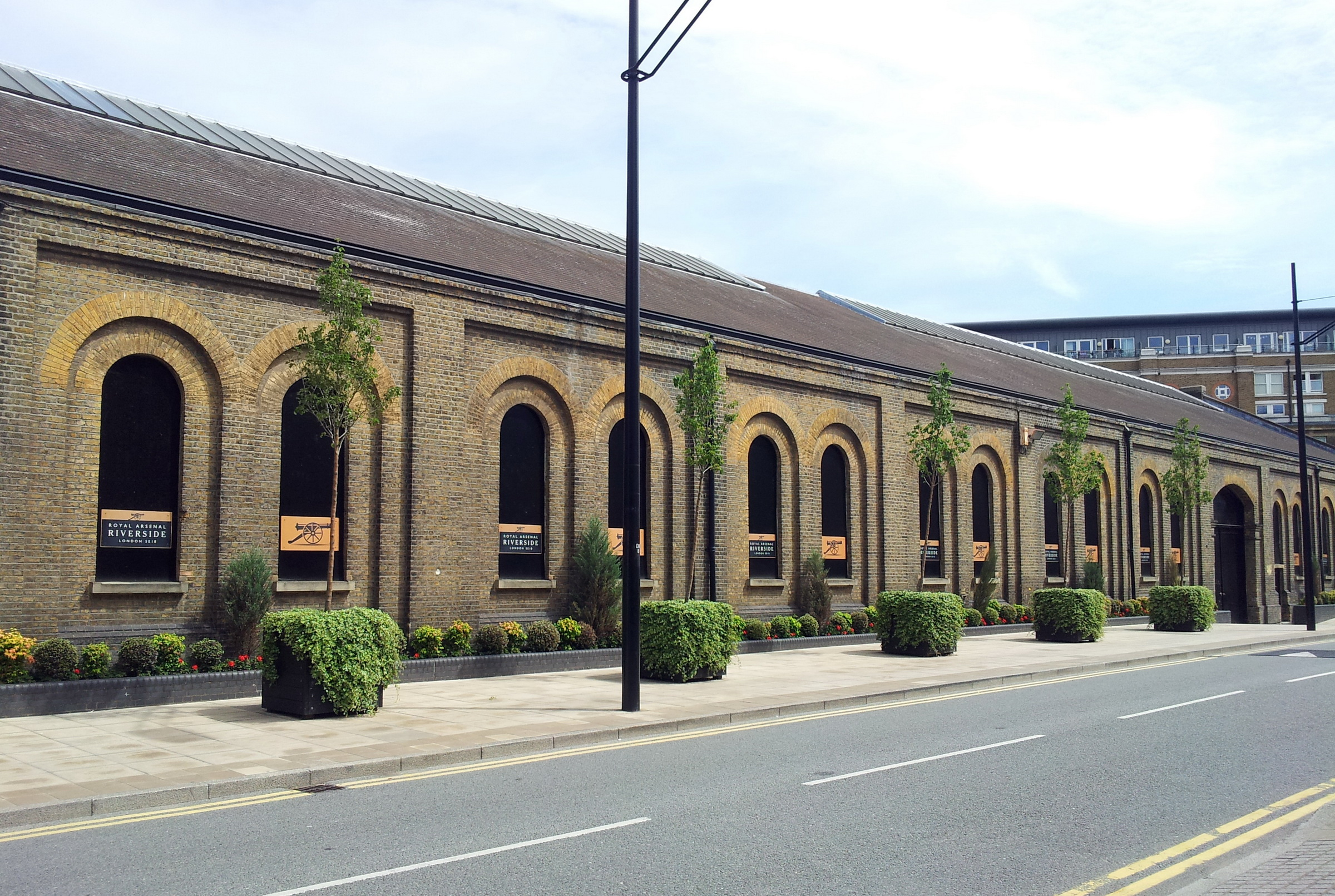
Building 19 was used for weapons research into the 1990s; built in 1887 on an area long known as the Mounting Ground, it was originally where guns from the Foundry were mounted on their carriages

During the quiet period after the end of the Second World War, the Royal Arsenal built railway wagons, between 1945 and 1949, and constructed knitting frames for the silk stockings industry, up to 1952. Armament production then increased during the Korean War.

From 1947, the British atomic weapons programme, called HER or High Explosive Research, was based at Fort Halstead in Kent (ARDE), and also at Woolwich. The first British atomic device was tested in 1952; Operation Hurricane. In 1951 the AWRE moved to RAF Aldermaston in Berkshire. ARDE, which had its origin in the Research and Design Departments of the Arsenal, retained its Woolwich outstation there until the 1980s.

In 1953, a body called Royal Arsenal Estate was set up to dispose of areas of land deemed surplus to requirements. An approximately 100 acres (40 ha) area of the site, around what is now Griffin Manor Way, was used for an industrial estate; the Ford Motor Company becoming its first tenant in 1955. Two of the roads on this estate Nathan Way and Kellner Road appear to have links with people connected with the Royal Arsenal: a Col. Nathan, at the Royal Gunpowder Factory; and, W. Kellner being the second War Office Chemist.

In 1957 a merger took place which created ROF Woolwich: thus, for the first time, the various manufacturing operations on the site were united into a single Royal Ordnance Factory. Its area of operation was henceforward restricted to the western part of the Arsenal site, with everything to the east being earmarked for eventual disposal. In this guise, the factory continued to operate (with upgraded facilities) for a further ten years. The Proof and Experimental Establishment closed in 1957, though RARDE continued to make use of the proof butts until September 1969.

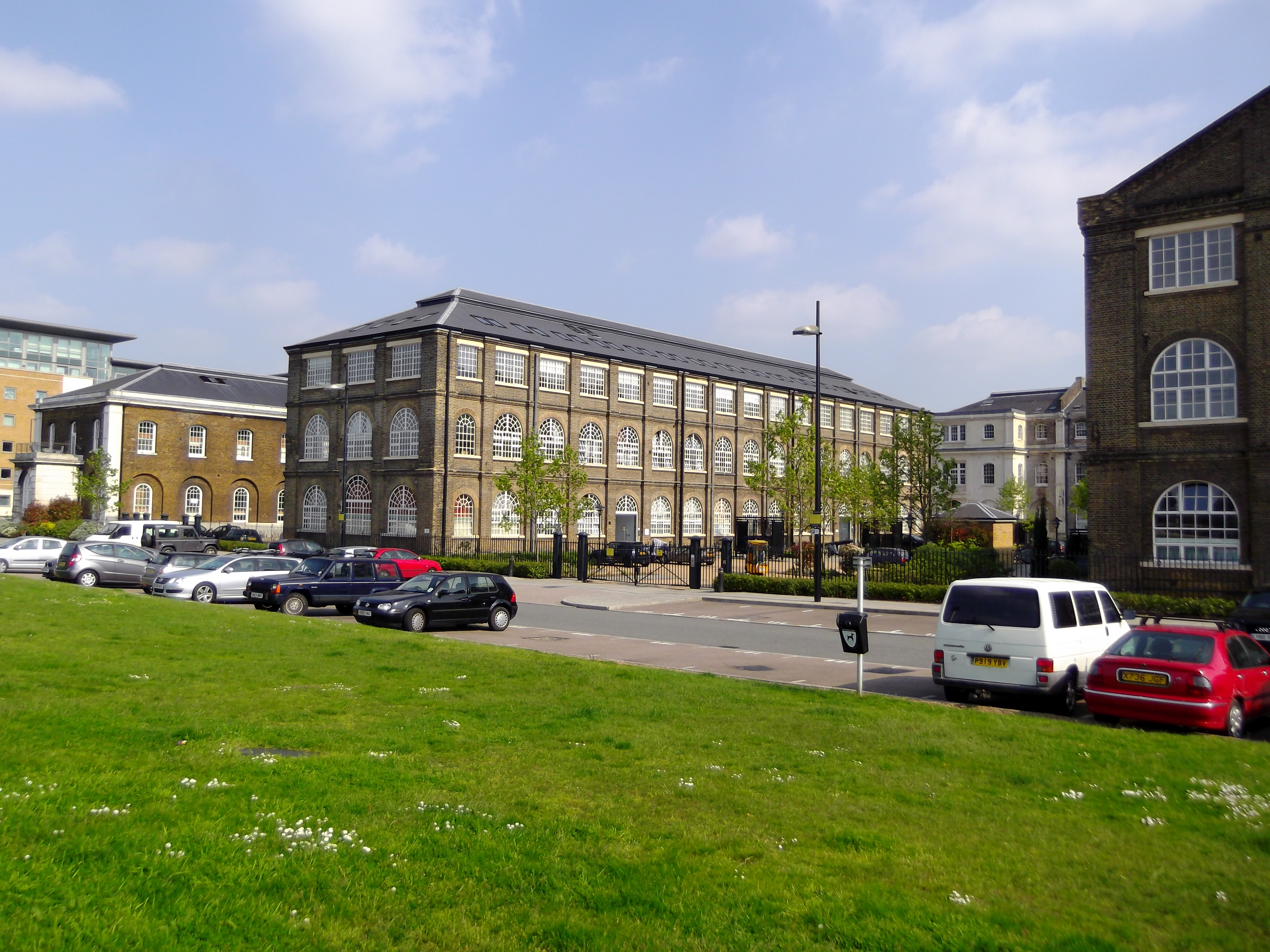
One of a pair of 1890s additions to the Grand Store site, used after 1962 as a book store by the British Library

The Woolwich Royal Ordnance Factories closed in 1967, and at the same time a large part of the eastern end of the site was sold to the Greater London Council. Much of it was used to build the new town of Thamesmead. Parts of the older (western) section of the site were leased as storage or office space to assorted public bodies (including HM Customs and Excise, the British Museum Library, the National Maritime Museum, the Property Services Agency); alongside these tenants, a variety of smaller MOD departments were accommodated, some on a temporary but others on a longer-term basis.

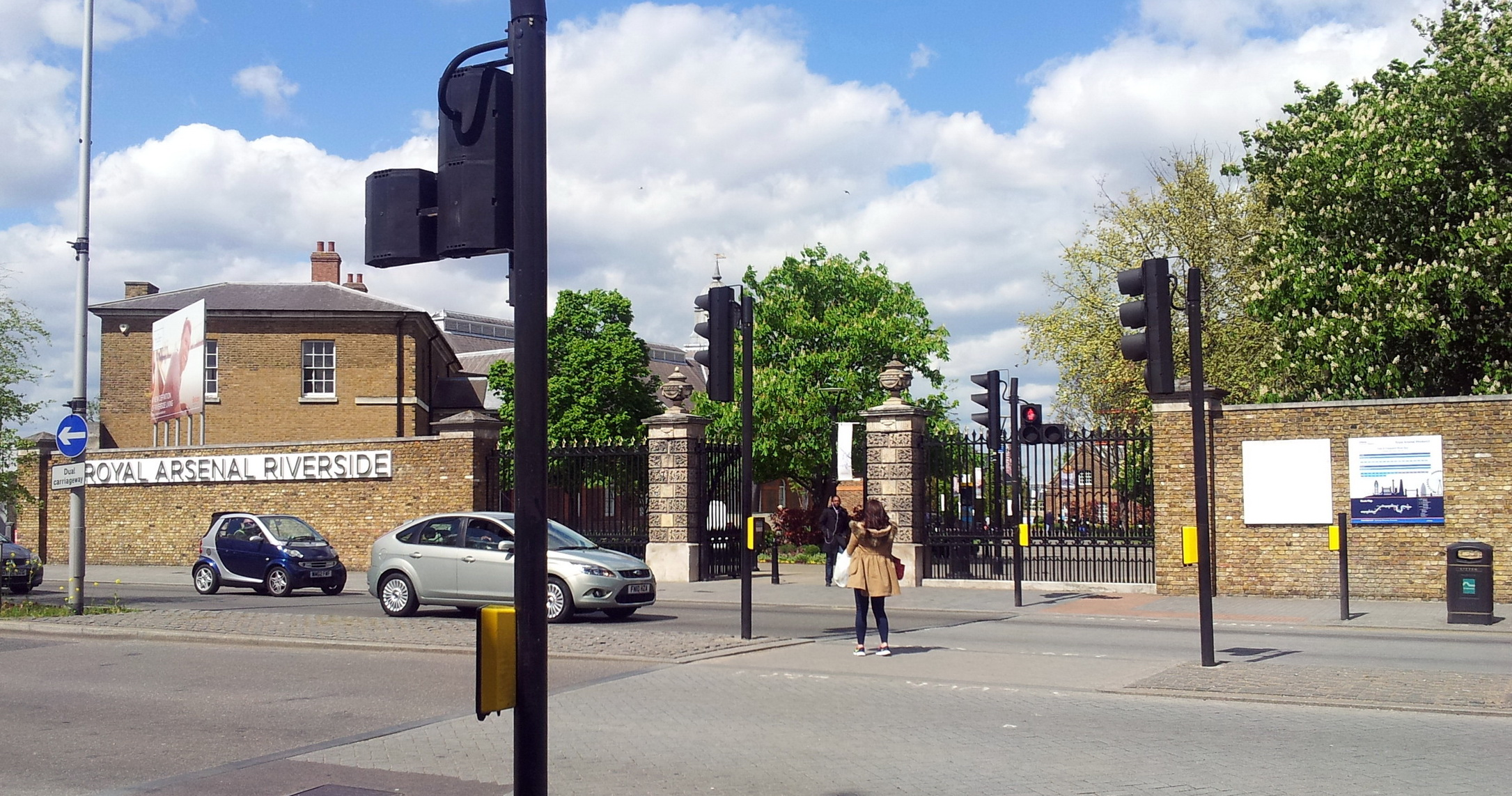
New main gate (1985)

Shortly after the closure of the Woolwich Royal Ordnance Factories, the Frog Island chemical laboratories were moved into a new building erected in 1971, in what was to become the Royal Arsenal East. The old Frog Island area was then sold off and a relocated Plumstead Bus Garage was built on part of this site. This action separated what remained of the Royal Arsenal, some 76 acres (310,000 m^{2}), into two sites: Royal Arsenal West, at Woolwich; and, Royal Arsenal East, at Plumstead, approached via Griffin Manor Way. It also led to breaking down of parts of the 1804 brick boundary wall. Part of it near Plumstead Bus station was replaced by iron railings and chain link fencing; later the public roadway (now the A206) was also changed at the Woolwich market area and the Royal Arsenal's boundary was moved inwards so that the Beresford Gate (which had served as the main entrance to the Arsenal since 1829) became separated from the site by the A206. Its mid-1980s replacement, north of the rerouted A206, stands not far from where the original (1720s) main gateway once stood; it is graced by a pair of 18th-century gatepiers and urns saved from The Paragon on the New Kent Road (itself demolished for road-widening in the 1960s).

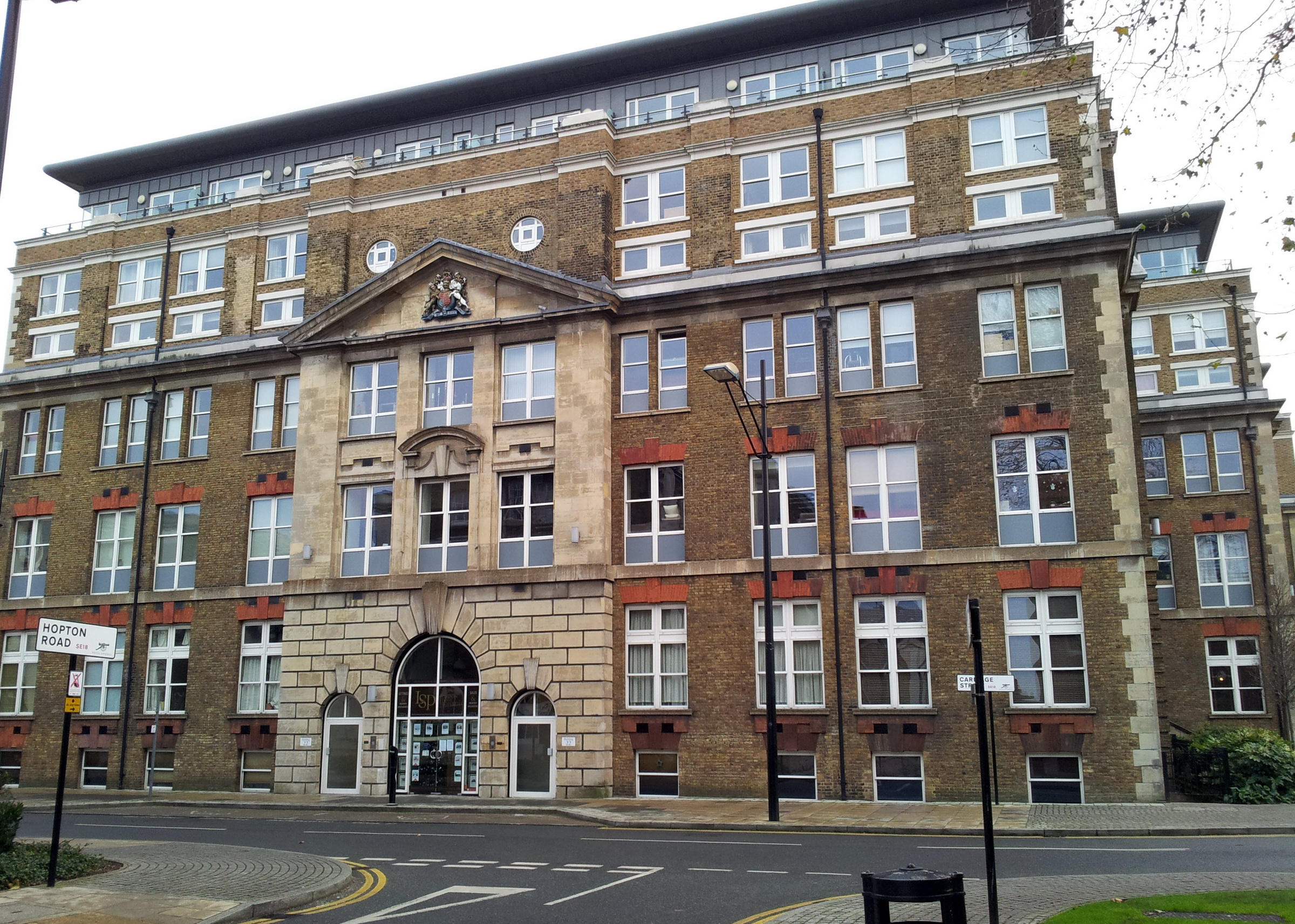
The vast Building 22, built as central offices for the entire Arsenal site in 1908, served as headquarters for the MOD's Quality Assurance Directorates after 1967

The Royal Arsenal site retained its links to ordnance production for almost another thirty years as a number of the Ministry of Defence Procurement Executive's Quality Assurance Directorates had their headquarters offices located there. These included the Materials Quality Assurance Directorate (MQAD), which looked after materiel, including explosives and pyrotechnics; and the Quality Assurance Directorate (Ordnance) (QAD (Ord)), which looked after ordnance for the Army. MQAD was the successor of the old War Department Chemist and the Chemical Inspectorate; QAD(Ord) was the successor of the Chief Inspector of Armaments department. There was a separate Naval Ordnance Inspection Department (based in Middlegate House from 1922) that looked after the Royal Navy's interests. QAD (Ord) was based at Royal Arsenal West together with a Ministry of Defence Publications section and part of the British Library's secure storage accommodation. MQAD was based, until closure of the site at Royal Arsenal East; and all the buildings on this site were given E numbers, such as E135. Belmarsh high-security prison was built on part of Royal Arsenal East, becoming operational in 1991.

The Royal Arsenal ceased to be a military establishment in 1994.

== Present day ==
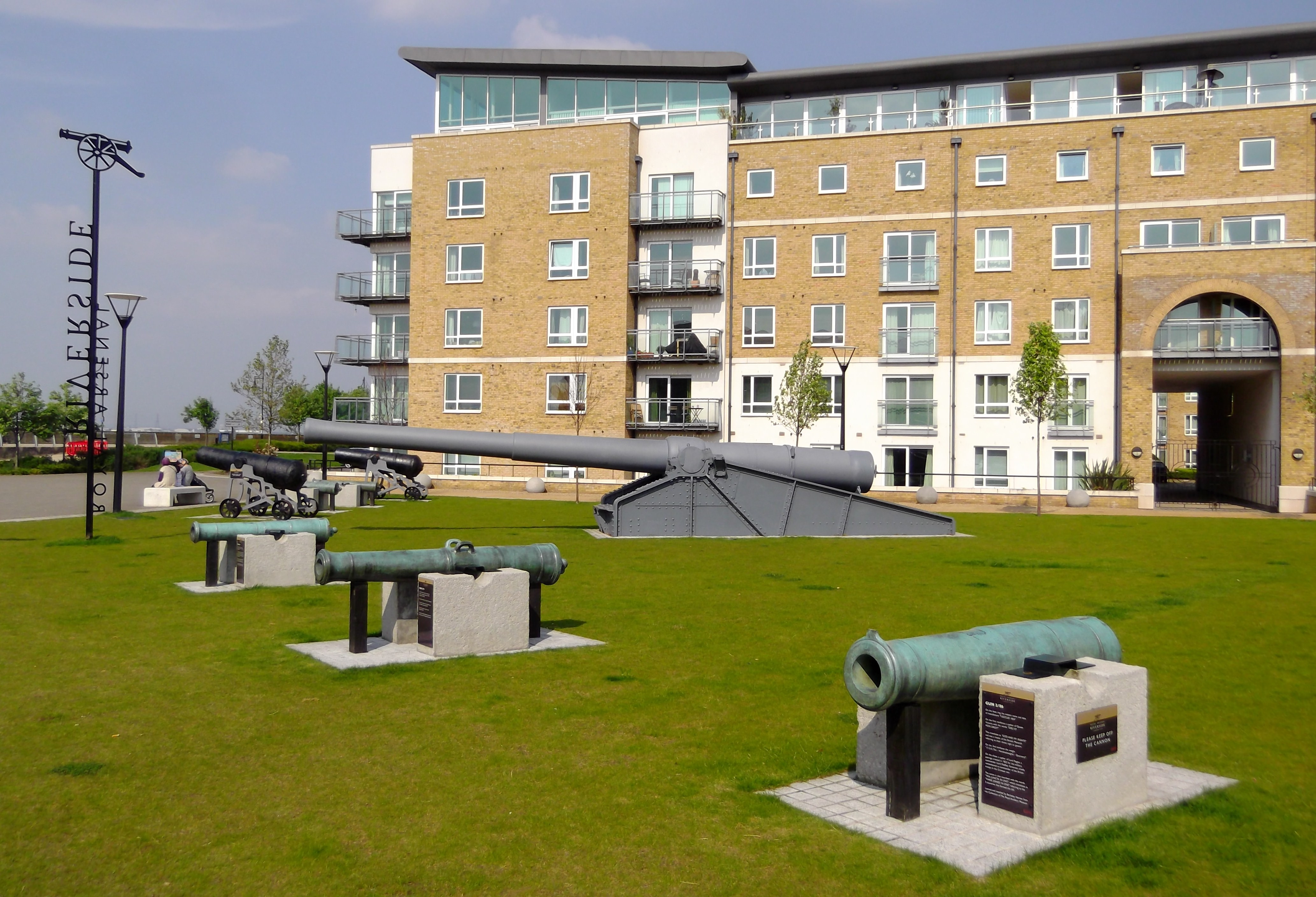
New housing on the Arsenal site

The sprawling Arsenal site is now one of the focal points for redevelopment in the Thames Gateway zone. Parts of the Royal Arsenal have been used to build residential and commercial buildings.

Some links to its historic past have been kept, with many notable buildings in the historic original (West) site being retained in the redevelopment. Attempts to put the history of the site into context were, however, short-lived: Firepower - The Royal Artillery Museum (direct successor of the Arsenal's Repository museum), which had presented the history of artillery alongside that of the regiment, closed in 2016; and Greenwich Heritage Centre, which told the story of Woolwich including the Royal Arsenal, closed in 2018.

=== Residential developments ===
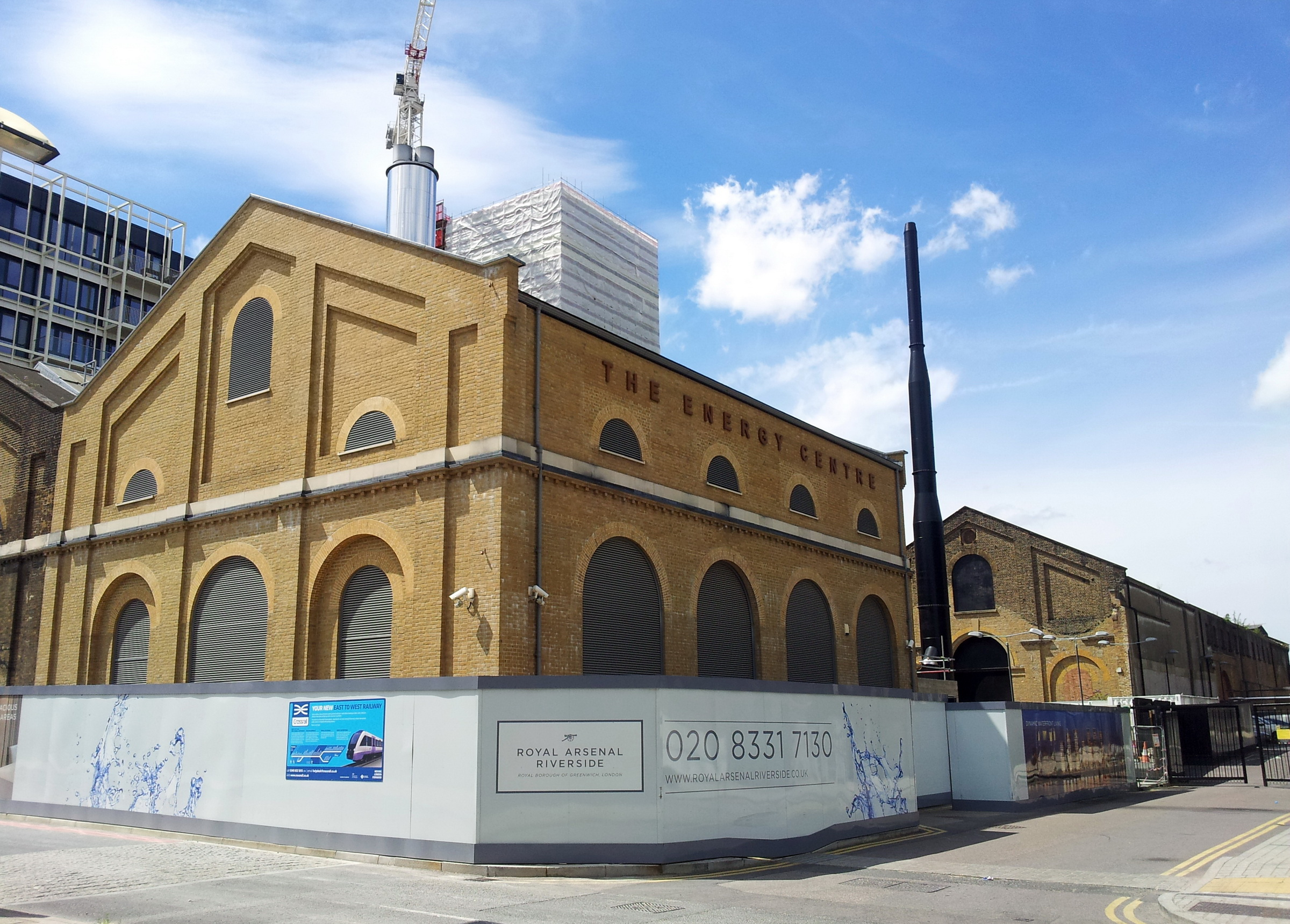
A 21st-century Energy Centre, providing electricity and hot water for the apartment blocks, replicates the design of the adjacent Land-service Gun Carriage Store (1803–4) and Erecting Shop (1887)

The western part of the Royal Arsenal has now been transformed into a mixed-use development by Berkeley Homes. It comprises one of the biggest concentrations of Grade I and Grade II listed buildings converted for residential use, with more than 3,000 residents. One of the earliest developments was Royal Artillery Quays, a series of glass towers rising along the riverside built by Barratt Homes in 2003. The first phase of homes at Royal Arsenal, "The Armouries", consisted of 455 new-build apartments in a six-storey building. This was followed by "The Warehouse, No.1 Street". The development has a residents' gym, a Thames Clippers stop on site, a Streetcar car club and a 24-hour concierge facility for residents. Wellington Park provides open space and a public house, the Dial Arch, opened in June 2010

Plans have now been submitted for a new masterplan encompassing further land along the river. More than 1,700 homes already exist at Royal Arsenal Riverside, with an additional 3,700 new homes planned, along with 270,000 sq ft (25,000 m^{2}) of commercial, retail, leisure space and a 120-bedroom hotel by Holiday-Inn Express. The plans also include Woolwich Crossrail station, opened in 2022, which was part-funded by Berkeley Homes.

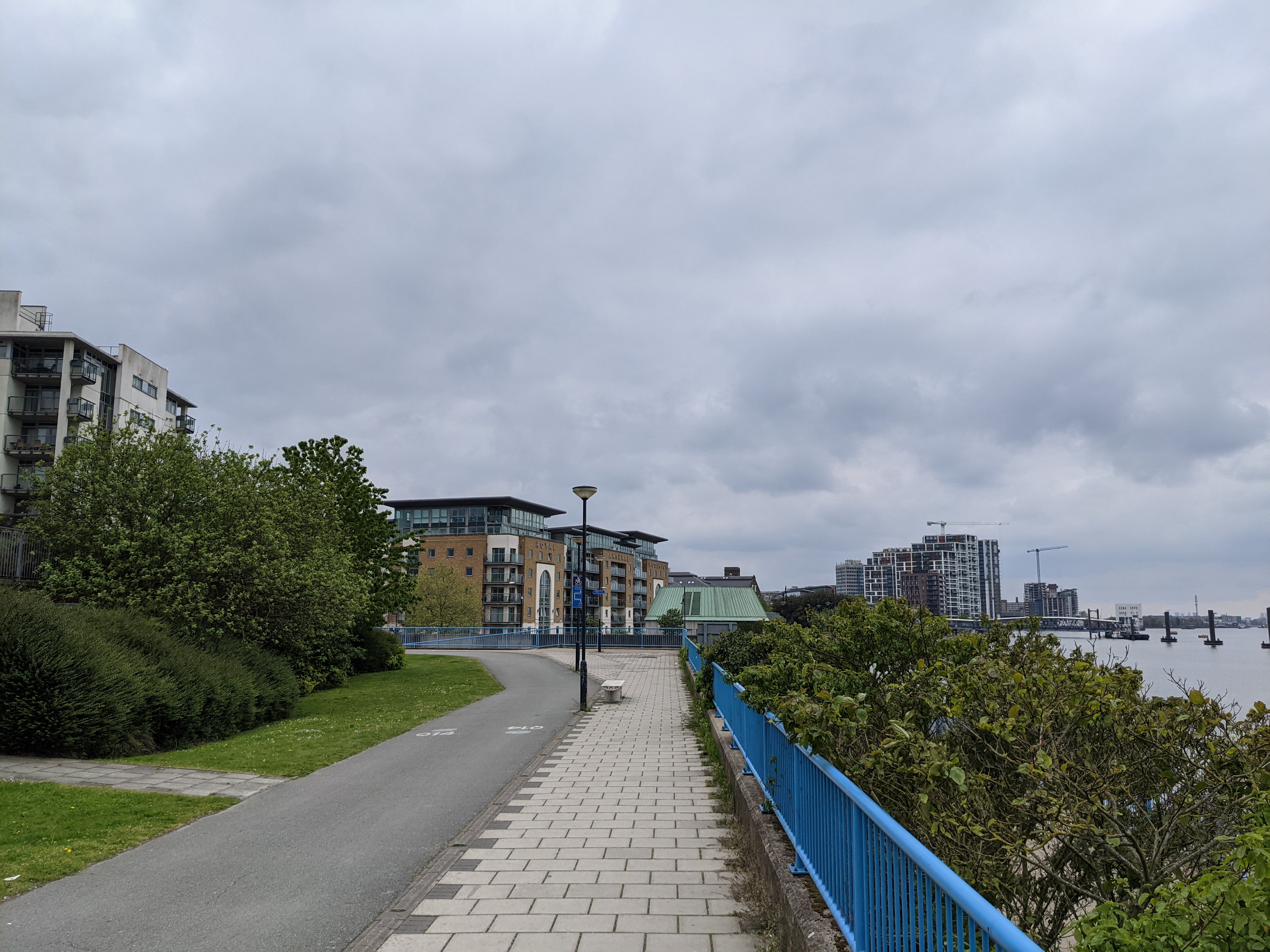
Thames Path - Building 50 and DLR ventilation shaft can be seen in Royal Arsenal

=== Cultural district ===
In October 2018, planning permission was granted for the first phase of a multi-million pound restoration of historic buildings near the new Woolwich Crossrail station, to create a 15,000sqm complex of theatres, dance studios and places to eat. Originally this development was known as 'Woolwich Creative District' but names of the district and buildings were later put to the public vote and in July 2019 the name 'Woolwich Works' was announced

=== Historic architecture ===
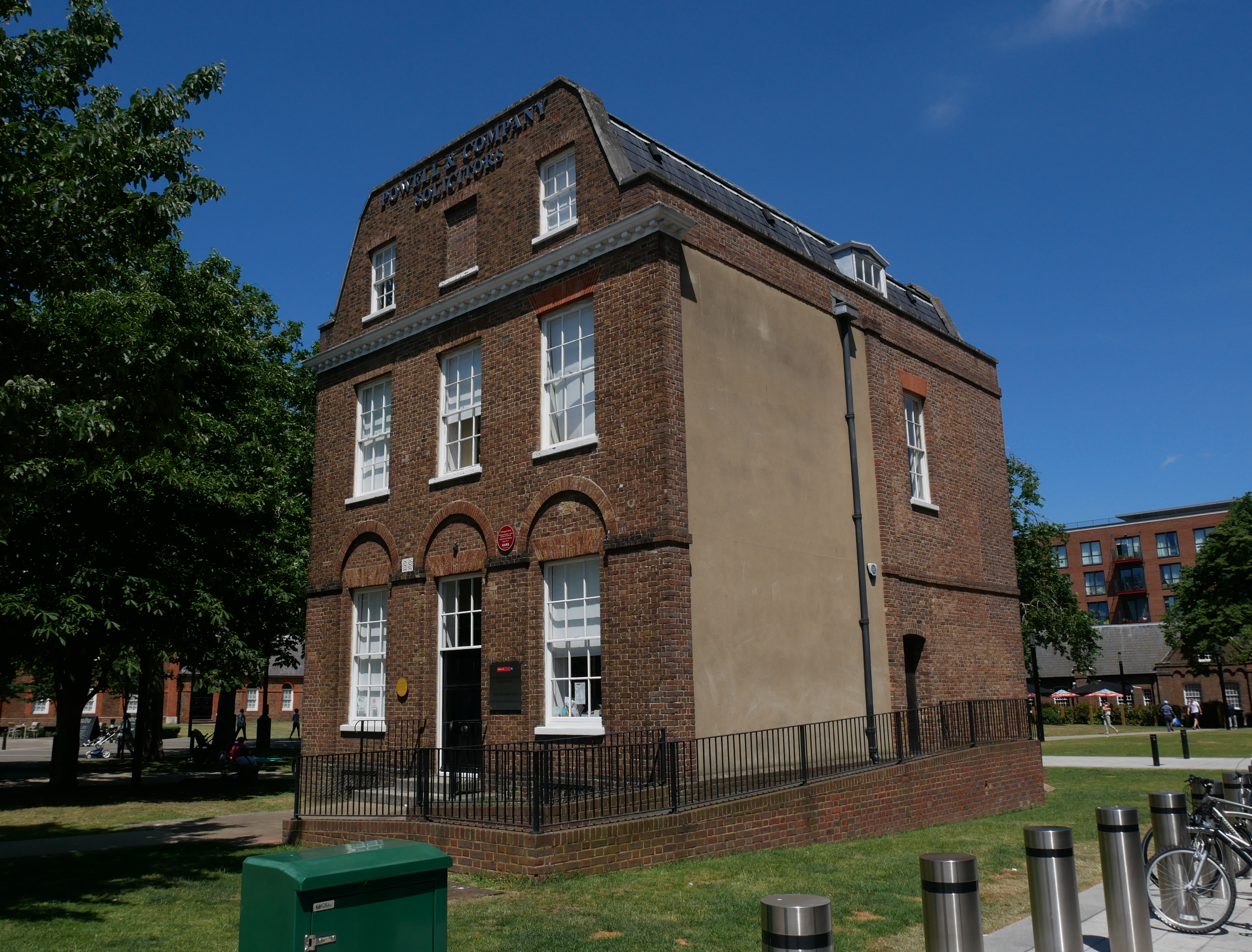
A house built for Master Founder Jan Verbruggen in 1772 was converted for office use in 2010, having stood empty for a quarter of a century

Several early 18th-century buildings on the site have been attributed to the architects Sir John Vanbrugh or Nicholas Hawksmoor (both of whom are known to have designed buildings for the Board of Ordnance), including the Royal Brass Foundry, Dial Arch and the Royal Military Academy; but whilst acknowledging their influence (direct or indirect), the Survey of London credits Brigadier-General Michael Richards (Surveyor-general for the Ordnance board at the time) as having played the leading part in their design. In the late-18th and early-19th centuries James Wyatt, as Architect of the Ordnance, was responsible for several buildings on the site, including the Main Guardhouse (1787), the Grand Store (1805) and Middlegate House (1807). More often than not, though, it was the on-site Engineers and Clerks of the Works who were responsible for the design of buildings and other structures within the working Arsenal.

== See also ==
- Greenwich Heritage Centre - local museum with Royal Arsenal exhibition
- Royal Arsenal Railway - railway inside the Royal Arsenal
- Broadwater Green - modern housing development on the grounds of the Arsenal
- Waltham Abbey Royal Gunpowder Mills - another historic munitions factory in the London area

== Sources ==
- Hogg, Brigadier O.F.G. (1963a). The Royal Arsenal Woolwich. Vol. I. London: Oxford University Press.
- Hogg, Brigadier O.F.G. (1963b). The Royal Arsenal: its Background, Origin and Subsequent History Woolwich. Vol. II. London: Oxford University Press.
- Hornby, William (1958). Factories and Plant. History of the Second World War: United Kingdom Civil Series. Her Majesty's Stationery Office and Longmans, Green and Co.
- Masters, Roy (1995). The Royal Arsenal, Woolwich. Britain in Old Photographs. Strood: Sutton Publishing. ISBN 0-7509-0894-7.
- Timbers, Brigadier Ken (2011). The Royal Arsenal, Woolwich. London: Royal Arsenal Woolwich Historical Society.
- Saint, Andrew; Guillery, Peter (2012). "Chapter 3: The Royal Arsenal". Woolwich. Survey of London. Vol. 48. Yale University Press. ISBN 978-0300187229.
