= Phoenicia =

Ancient Semitic maritime civilization

Coordinates: 34°07′25″N 35°39′04″E

- c. 2000 – 64 BC
- Phoenicia and its major cities
- Capital: None; dominant cities were Byblos, Sidon, and Tyre
- Common languages: Phoenician
- Religion: Canaanite religion
- Demonym: Phoenicians
- Government: City-states ruled by kings, with varying degrees of oligarchy or plutocracy; oligarchic republic in Carthage after c. 480 BC
- Major kings of Phoenician cities
  - c. 1800 BC: Abishemu I
  - 969–936 BC: Hiram I
  - 820–774 BC: Pygmalion of Tyre
- Historical era: Archaic period to Classical antiquity
  - Established: 2000 BC
  - Tyre becomes dominant city-state under the reign of Hiram I: 969 BC
  - Carthage founded (in Roman accounts by Dido): 814 BC
  - Roman annexation: 64 BC
Preceded by
| Canaanites |
| Hittite Empire |
| Egyptian Empire |
Succeeded by
| Roman Republic |

The Phoenicians were an ancient Semitic-speaking people who inhabited city-states in Canaan along the Levantine coast of the eastern Mediterranean, primarily in present-day Lebanon. Their maritime civilization expanded and contracted over time, with its cultural core stretching from Arwad to Mount Carmel. Through trade and colonization, the Phoenicians extended their influence across the Mediterranean, from Cyprus to the Maghreb and Iberian Peninsula, leaving behind thousands of inscriptions.

The Phoenicians emerged directly from the Bronze Age Canaanites, and their cultural traditions survived the Late Bronze Age collapse, continuing into the Iron Age with little interruption. They referred to themselves as Canaanites and their land as Canaan, though the territory they occupied was smaller than that of earlier Bronze Age Canaan. The name Phoenicia is a Greek exonym that did not correspond to a unified native identity. Modern scholarship generally views the distinction between Canaanites and Phoenicians after c. 1200 BC as artificial.

Renowned for seafaring and trade, the Phoenicians established one of antiquity's most extensive maritime networks, active for over a millennium. This network facilitated exchanges among cradles of civilization such as Mesopotamia, Egypt, and Greece. They founded colonies and trading posts throughout the Mediterranean; among these, Carthage in the Mediterranean Maghreb developed into a major power by the 7th century BC.

Phoenician society was organized into independent city-states, notably Byblos, Sidon, and Tyre. Each retained political autonomy, and there is no evidence of a shared national identity. While kingship was common, powerful merchant families likely exercised influence through oligarchies. The Phoenician cities flourished most in the 9th century BC, but subsequently declined under the expansion of empires such as the Neo-Assyrian and Achaemenid. Their influence nevertheless endured in the western Mediterranean until the Roman destruction of Carthage in the mid-2nd century BC.

Long regarded as a "lost" civilization due to the absence of native historical accounts, the Phoenicians became better understood only after the discovery of inscriptions in the 17th and 18th centuries. Since the mid-20th century, archaeological research has revealed their significance in the ancient world. Their most enduring legacy remains the development of the earliest verified alphabet, derived from the Proto-Sinaitic script, which spread across the Mediterranean and gave rise to the Greek alphabet, ancestor of the Latin and Cyrillic scripts, while also influencing the Syriac and Arabic writing systems. They also contributed innovations in shipbuilding, navigation, industry, agriculture, and governance. Their commercial networks played a foundational role in the economic and cultural development of classical Mediterranean civilization.

== Etymology ==
Being a society of independent city-states, the Phoenicians apparently did not have a term to denote the land of Phoenicia as a whole; instead, demonyms were often derived from the name of the city a person hailed from (e.g., Sidonian for Sidon, Tyrian for Tyre, etc.) There is no evidence that the peoples living in the area denoted as Phoenicia identified as "Phoenicians" or shared a common identity, although they may have referred to themselves as "Canaanites". Krahmalkov reconstructs the Honeyman inscription (dated to c. 900 BC by William F. Albright) as containing a reference to the Phoenician homeland, calling it Pūt (Phoenician: 𐤐𐤕).

Furthermore, as late as the first century BC, a distinction appears to have been made between 'Syrian' and 'Phoenician' people, as evidenced by the epitaph of Meleager of Gadara: 'If you are a Syrian, Salam! If you are a Phoenician, Naidius! If you are a Greek, Chaire! (Hail), and say the same yourself.'

Obelisks at Karnak contain references to a "land of fnḫw", fnḫw being the plural form of fnḫ, the Ancient Egyptian word for 'carpenter'. This "land of carpenters" is generally identified as Phoenicia, given that Phoenicia played a central role in the lumber trade of the Levant. As an exonym, fnḫw was evidently loaned into Greek as φοῖνιξ, phoînix, which meant variably 'Phoenician person', 'Tyrian purple, crimson' or 'date palm'. Homer used it with each of these meanings. The word is already attested in Linear B script of Mycenaean Greek from the 2nd millennium BC, as po-ni-ki-jo. In those records, it means 'crimson' or 'palm tree' and does not denote a group of people. The name Phoenicians, like Latin Poenī (adj. poenicus, later pūnicus), comes from Greek Φοινίκη, Phoiníkē. According to Krahmalkov, Poenulus, a Latin comedic play written in the early 2nd century BC, appears to preserve a Punic term for the Phoenician/Punic language which may be reconstructed as Pōnnīm, a point disputed by Joseph Naveh, a professor of West Semitic epigraphy and palaeography at the Hebrew University.

== History ==
Since little has survived of Phoenician records or literature, most of what is known about their origins and history comes from the accounts of other civilizations and inferences from their material culture excavated throughout the Mediterranean. The scholarly consensus is that the Phoenicians' period of greatest prominence was 1200 BC to the end of the Persian period (332 BC).

It is debated among historians and archaeologists whether Phoenicians were actually distinct from the broader group of Semitic-speaking peoples known as Canaanites. Historian Robert Drews believes the term "Canaanites" corresponds to the ethnic group referred to as "Phoenicians" by the ancient Greeks; archaeologist Jonathan N. Tubb argues that "Ammonites, Moabites, Israelites, and Phoenicians undoubtedly achieved their own cultural identities, and yet ethnically they were all Canaanites", "the same people who settled in farming villages in the region in the 8th millennium BC". Brian R. Doak states that scholars use "Phoenicians" as a short-hand for "Canaanites living in a set of cities along the northern Levantine coast who shared a language and material culture in the Iron I–II period and who also developed an organized system of colonies in the western Mediterranean world".

The Phoenician Early Bronze Age is largely unknown. The two most important sites are Byblos and Dakerman (near Sidon), although, as of 2021, well over a hundred sites remain to be excavated, while others that have been are yet to be fully analysed. The Middle Bronze Age was a generally peaceful time of increasing population, trade, and prosperity, though there was competition for natural resources. In the Late Bronze Age, rivalry between Egypt, the Mittani, the Hittites, and Assyria had a significant impact on Phoenician cities.

=== Origins ===
The Canaanite culture that gave rise to the Phoenicians apparently developed in situ from the earlier Ghassulian chalcolithic culture. The Ghassulian culture itself developed from the Circum-Arabian Nomadic Pastoral Complex, which in turn developed from a fusion of their ancestral Natufian and Harifian cultures with Pre-Pottery Neolithic B (PPNB) farming cultures. These practiced the domestication of animals during the 8.2 kiloyear event, which led to the Neolithic Revolution in the Levant. The Late Bronze Age state of Ugarit is considered Canaanite, even though the Ugaritic language does not belong to the Canaanite languages proper, and some of the texts on clay tablets discovered there indicate that the inhabitants of Ugarit did not consider themselves Canaanites.

The fifth-century BC Greek historian Herodotus claimed that the Phoenicians had migrated from the Erythraean Sea around 2750 BC and the first-century AD geographer Strabo reports a claim that they came from Tylos and Arad (Bahrain and Muharraq). Some archaeologists working on the Persian Gulf have accepted these traditions and suggest a migration connected with the collapse of the Dilmun civilization c. 1750 BC. However, most scholars reject the idea of a migration; archaeological and historical evidence alike indicate millennia of population continuity in the region, and recent genetic research indicates that present-day Lebanese derive most of their ancestry from a Canaanite-related population.

=== Emergence during the Late Bronze Age (1479–1200 BC) ===
The first known account of the Phoenicians relates the conquests of Pharaoh Thutmose III (1479–1425 BC), including the subjugation of those the Egyptians called Fenekhu ('carpenters'). The Egyptians targeted the coastal cities such as Byblos, Arwad, and Ullasa for their crucial geographic and commercial links with the interior (via the Nahr al-Kabir and the Orontes rivers). The cities provided Egypt with access to Mesopotamian trade and abundant stocks of the region's native cedarwood, of which there was no equivalent in the Egyptian homeland. Thutmose IV himself visited Sidon, where the purchase of lumber from Lebanon was arranged.

By the mid-14th century BC, the Phoenician city-states were considered "favored cities" by the Egyptians. Tyre, Sidon, Beirut, and Byblos were regarded as the most important. The Phoenicians had considerable autonomy, and their cities were reasonably well developed and prosperous. Byblos was the leading city; it was a center for bronze-making and the primary terminus of trade routes for precious goods such as tin and lapis lazuli from as far east as Afghanistan. Sidon and Tyre also commanded the interest of Egyptian governmental officials, beginning a pattern of commercial rivalry that would span the next millennium.

The Amarna letters report that from 1350 to 1300 BC, neighboring Amorites and Hittites were capturing Phoenician cities, especially in the north. Egypt subsequently lost its coastal holdings from Ugarit in northern Syria to Byblos near central Lebanon.

=== Ascendance and high point (1200–800 BC) ===
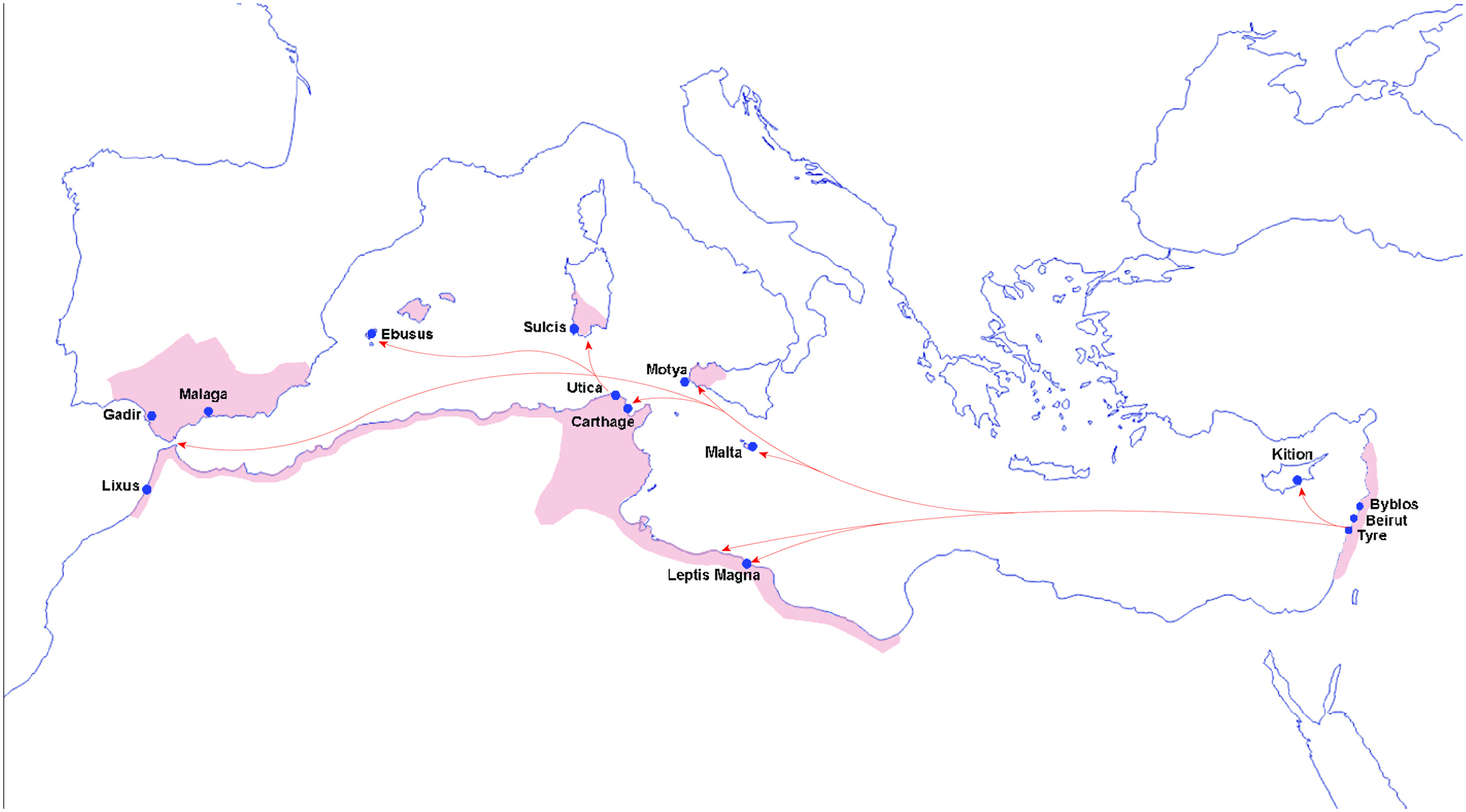
Approximate extent of Phoenician settlements and trade routes c. 800 BC.

Sometime between 1200 and 1150 BC, the Late Bronze Age collapse severely weakened or destroyed most civilizations in the region, including those of the Egyptians and the Hittites. The Phoenicians were able to survive and navigate the challenges of the crisis, and by 1230 BC city-states such as Tyre, Sidon, and Byblos maintained political independence, asserted their maritime interests, and enjoyed economic prosperity.

The period sometimes described as a "Phoenician renaissance" had begun, and by the end of the 11th century BC, an alliance formed between Tyre and Israel had created a new geopolitical status quo in the Levant. Commercial maritime activity now involved not just mercantilism, but colonization as well, and Phoenician expansion into the Mediterranean was well under way. The Phoenician city-states during this time were Tyre, Sidon, Byblos, Aradus, Beirut, and Tripoli. They filled the power vacuum caused by the Late Bronze Age collapse and created a vast mercantile network.

The recovery of the Mediterranean economy can be credited to Phoenician mariners and merchants, who re-established long-distance trade between Egypt and Mesopotamia in the 10th century BC.

Early in the Iron Age, the Phoenicians established ports, warehouses, markets, and settlements all across the Mediterranean and up to the southern Black Sea. Colonies were established on Cyprus, Sardinia, the Balearic Islands, Sicily, and Malta, as well as the coasts of North Africa and the Iberian Peninsula. Phoenician hacksilver dated to this period bears lead isotope ratios matching ores in Sardinia and Spain, indicating the extent of Phoenician trade networks.

By the tenth century BC, Tyre rose to become the richest and most powerful Phoenician city-state, particularly during the reign of Hiram I (c. 969–936 BC). The expertise of Phoenician artisans sent by Hiram I of Tyre in significant construction projects during the reign of Solomon, the King of Israel, is alluded to in the Hebrew Bible, although the reliability of this biblical history is disputed by some scientific researchers in modern times.

During the rule of the priest Ithobaal (887–856 BC), Tyre expanded its territory as far north as Beirut and into part of Cyprus; this unusual act of aggression was the closest the Phoenicians ever came to forming a unitary territorial state. Once his realm reached its largest territorial extent, Ithobaal declared himself "King of the Sidonians", a title that would be used by his successors and mentioned in both Greek and Jewish accounts.

The Late Iron Age saw the height of Phoenician shipping, mercantile, and cultural activity, particularly between 750 and 650 BC. The Phoenician influence was visible in the "orientalization" of Greek cultural and artistic conventions. Among their most popular goods were fine textiles, typically dyed with Tyrian purple. Homer's Iliad, which was composed during this period, references the quality of Phoenician clothing and metal goods.

=== Foundation of Carthage ===
Carthage was founded by Phoenicians coming from Tyre, probably to provide an anchorage and supplies to the Tyrian merchants in their voyages. The city's name in Punic, Qart-Ḥadašt (𐤒𐤓𐤕 𐤇𐤃𐤔𐤕), means 'New City'. There is a tradition in some ancient sources, such as Philistos of Syracuse, for an "early" foundation date of around 1215 BC—before the fall of Troy in 1180 BC. However, Timaeus, a Greek historian from Sicily c. 300 BC, places the foundation of Carthage in 814 BC, which is the date generally accepted by modern historians. Legend, including Virgil's Aeneid, assigns the founding of the city to Queen Dido. Carthage would grow into a multi-ethnic empire spanning North Africa, Sardinia, Sicily, Malta, the Balearic Islands, and southern Iberia, but would ultimately be destroyed by Rome in the Punic Wars (264–146 BC). It was eventually rebuilt as a Roman city by Julius Caesar in the period from 49 to 44 BC, with the official name Colonia Iulia Concordia Carthago.

=== Vassalage under the Assyrians and Babylonians (858–538 BC) ===
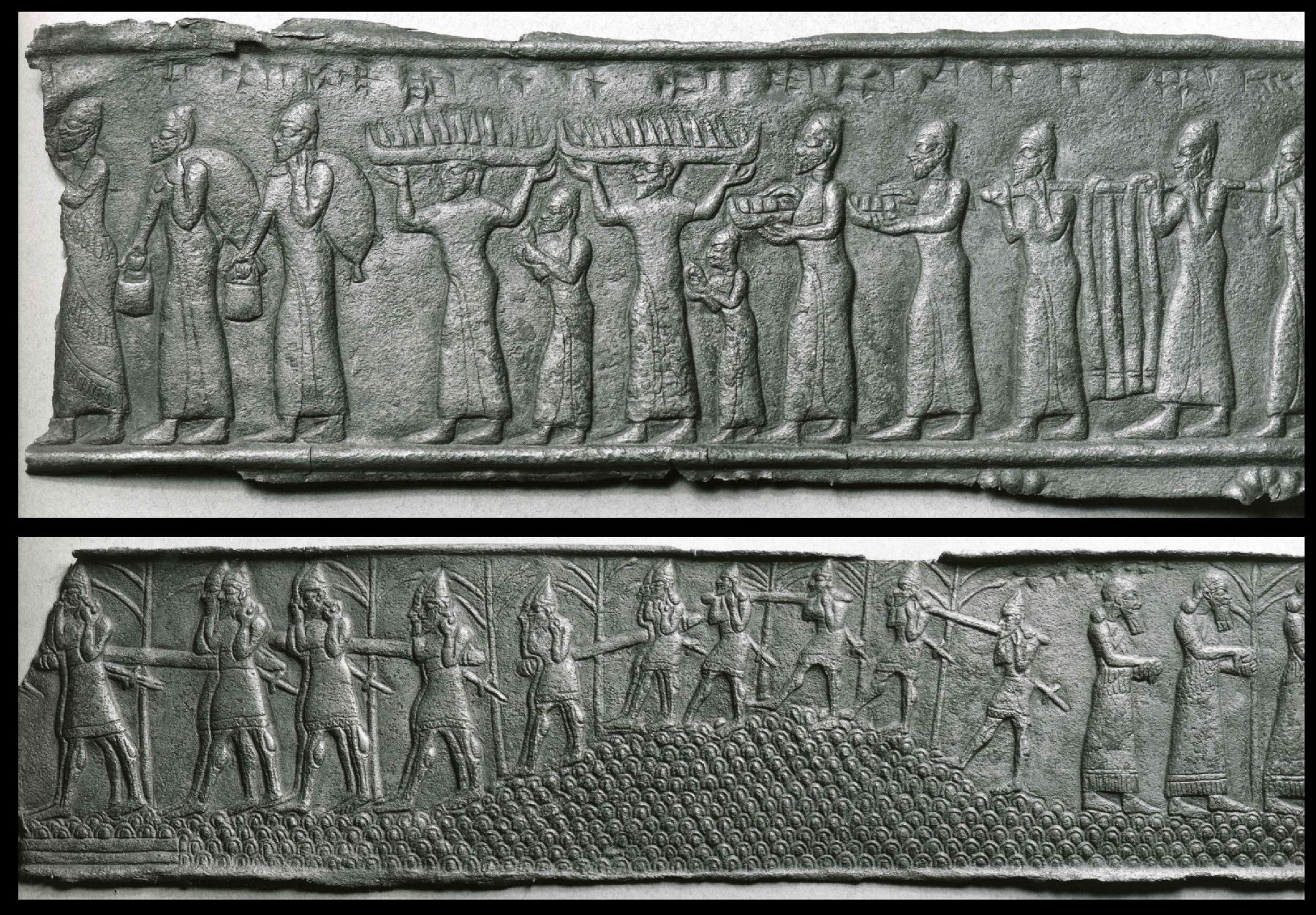
Two bronze fragments from an Assyrian palace gate depicting the collection of tribute from the Phoenician cities of Tyre and Sidon (859–824 BC). British Museum.

As mercantile city-states concentrated along a narrow coastal strip of land, the Phoenicians lacked the size and population to support a large military. Thus, as neighboring empires began to rise, the Phoenicians increasingly fell under the sway of foreign rulers, who to varying degrees circumscribed their autonomy.

The Assyrian domination of Phoenicia began with King Shalmaneser III. He rose to power in 858 BC and began a series of campaigns against neighboring states. Although he did not invade Phoenicia and maintained good relations with the Phoenician cities, he demanded tribute from the "kings of the seacoast", a group which probably included the Phoenician city-states. According to Aubet, Tyre, Sidon, Arwad and Byblos paid tribute in bronze and bronze vessels, tin, silver, gold, ebony and ivory. Initially, they were not annexed outright—they were allowed a certain degree of freedom. This changed in 744 BC with the ascension of Tiglath-Pileser III. By 738 BC, most of the Levant, including northern Phoenicia, was annexed; only Tyre and Byblos, the most powerful city-states, remained tributary states outside of direct Assyrian control.

Tyre, Byblos, and Sidon all rebelled against Assyrian rule. In 721 BC, Sargon II besieged Tyre and crushed the rebellion. His successor Sennacherib suppressed further rebellions across the region. During the seventh century BC, Sidon rebelled and was destroyed by Esarhaddon, who enslaved its inhabitants and built a new city on its ruins. Esarhaddon's mass purges of Assyrian state officials by execution greatly weakened the functioning of the Assyrian administrative state, and by the end of the seventh century BC, the Assyrian empire had been weakened by successive revolts. It experienced a swift and violent fall, destroyed by a Babylonian uprising and an invasion by the Medes.

The Babylonians, formerly vassals of the Assyrians, took advantage of the empire's collapse and rebelled, quickly establishing the Neo-Babylonian Empire in its place. Phoenician cities revolted several times throughout the reigns of the first Babylonian kings: Nabopolassar (626–605 BC) and his son Nebuchadnezzar II (c. 605 – c. 562 BC). Nebuchadnezzar besieged Tyre, his siege commonly having been thought to have lasted thirteen years, although the city was not destroyed and suffered little damage. The consensus opinion in contemporary Phoenician historiography is that the thirteen-year siege began soon after the conquest of Jerusalem in 587 BC, and lasted from 585 BC through 573 BC. Josephus, a first-century historian, is the sole ancient source specifying the duration of Nebuchadnezzar's alleged thirteen-year siege of Tyre in the early sixth century BC, nearly 700 years after the claimed event. Helen Dixon proposes that the putative 'thirteen-year' siege was more likely several small-scale interventions in the region, or a limited blockade between the land-side city and its port.

=== Persian period (539–332 BC) ===
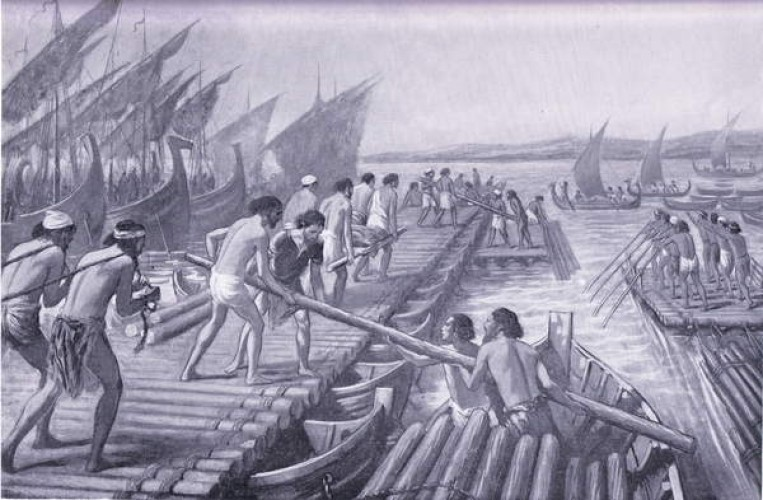
Phoenicians build pontoon bridges for Xerxes I of Persia during the second Persian invasion of Greece in 480 BC (1915 drawing by A. C. Weatherstone).

In 539 BC, Cyrus the Great, king and founder of the Persian Achaemenid Empire, took Babylon. As Cyrus began consolidating territories across the Near East, the Phoenicians apparently made the pragmatic calculation of "[yielding] themselves to the Persians". Most of the Levant was consolidated by Cyrus into a single satrapy (province) and forced to pay a yearly tribute of 350 talents, which was roughly half the tribute that was required of Egypt and Libya.

The Phoenician area was later divided into four vassal kingdoms —Sidon, Tyre, Arwad, and Byblos — which were afforded considerable autonomy. Unlike in other areas of the Achaemenid Empire, no records of Persian administration of Phoenician city-states exist Local Phoenician kings were allowed to remain in power and given the same rights as Persian satraps (governors), such as hereditary offices and the minting of coinage.

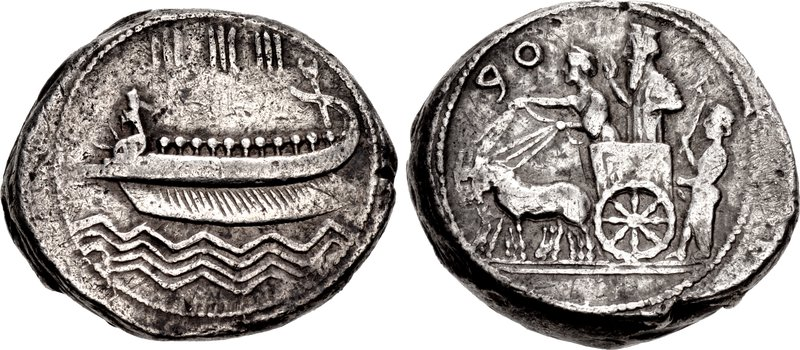
Achaemenid-era coin of Abdashtart I of Sidon, who is seen at the back of the chariot, behind the Persian King

The Phoenicians remained a core asset to the Achaemenid Empire, particularly for their prowess in maritime technology and navigation; they furnished the bulk of the Persian fleet during the Greco-Persian Wars of the late fifth century BC. Phoenicians under Xerxes I built the Xerxes Canal and the pontoon bridges that allowed his forces to cross into mainland Greece. Nevertheless, they were harshly punished by Xerxes following his defeat at the Battle of Salamis, which he blamed on Phoenician cowardice and incompetence.

In the mid-fourth century BC, King Tennes of Sidon led a failed rebellion against Artaxerxes III, enlisting the help of the Egyptians, who were subsequently drawn into a war with the Persians. The resulting destruction of Sidon led to the resurgence of Tyre, which remained the dominant Phoenician city for two decades until the arrival of Alexander the Great.

=== Hellenistic period (332–152 BC) ===
Phoenicia was one of the first areas to be conquered by Alexander the Great during his military campaigns across western Asia. Alexander's main target in the Persian Levant was Tyre, now the region's largest and most important city. It capitulated after a roughly seven month siege, during which some of its non-combatant citizens were sent to Carthage. Tyre's refusal to allow Alexander to visit its temple to Melqart, culminating in the killing of his envoys, led to a brutal reprisal: 2,000 of its leading citizens were crucified and a puppet ruler was installed. The rest of Phoenicia easily came under his control, with Sidon surrendering peacefully.

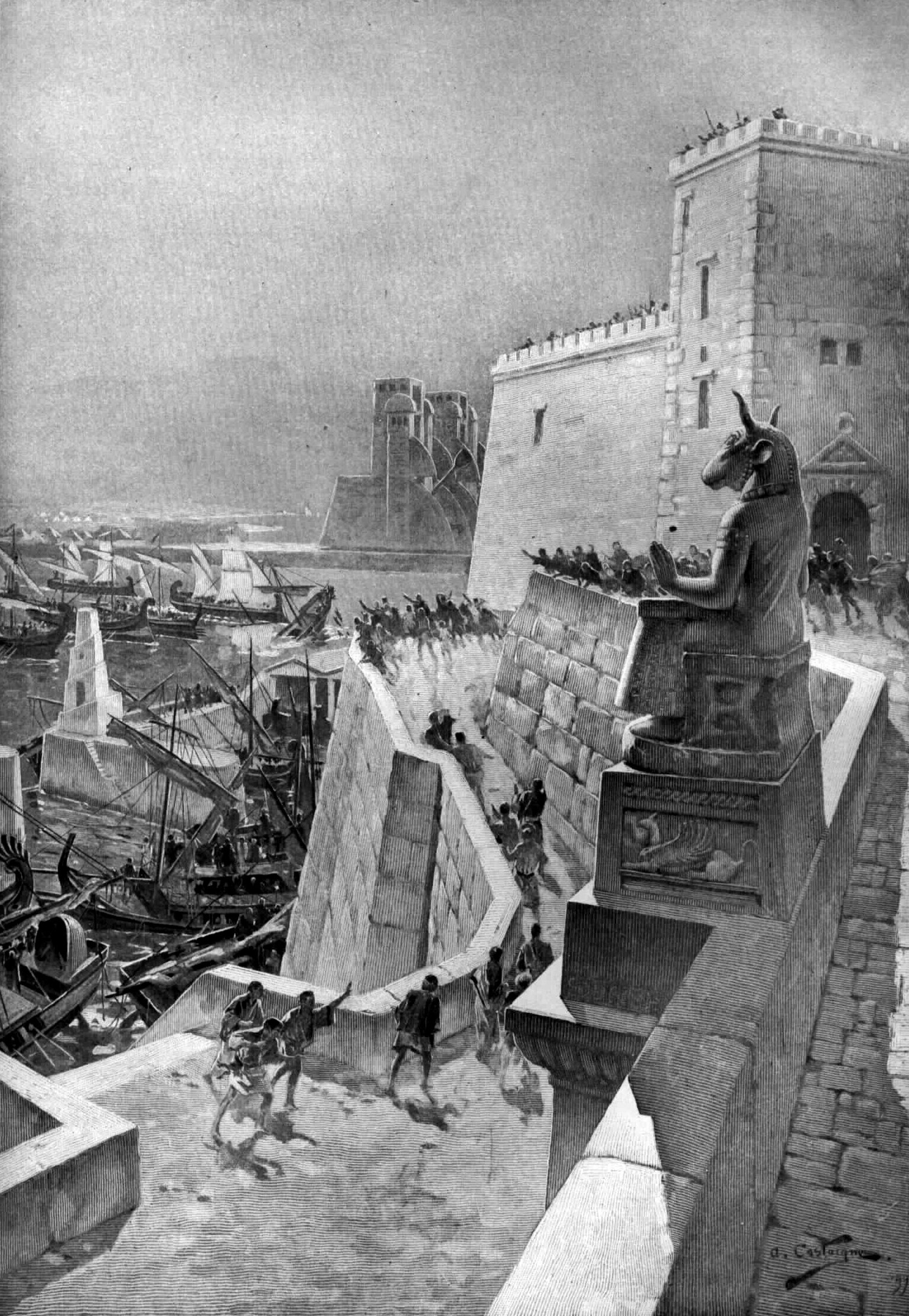
A naval action during Alexander the Great's Siege of Tyre (332 BC). Drawing by André Castaigne, 1888–89.

Alexander's empire had a Hellenization policy, whereby Hellenic culture, religion, and sometimes language were spread or imposed across conquered peoples. However, Hellenization was not enforced most of the time and was just a language of administration until his death. This was typically implemented in other lands through the founding of new cities, the settlement of a Macedonian or Greek urban elite, and the alteration of native place names to Greek. However, there was no organized Hellenization in Phoenicia, and with one or two minor exceptions, all Phoenician city-states retained their native names, while Greek settlement and administration appears to have been very limited.

The Phoenicians maintained cultural and commercial links with their western counterparts. Polybius recounts how the Seleucid King Demetrius I escaped from Rome by boarding a Carthaginian ship that was delivering goods to Tyre. The adaptation to Macedonian rule was probably aided by the Phoenicians' historical ties with the Greeks, with whom they shared some mythological stories and figures; the two peoples were even sometimes considered "relatives".

When Alexander's empire collapsed after his death in 323 BC, the Phoenicians came under the control of the largest of its successors, the Seleucids. The Phoenician homeland was repeatedly contested by the Ptolemaic Kingdom of Egypt during the forty-year Syrian Wars, coming under Ptolemaic rule in the third century BC. The Seleucids reclaimed the area the following century, holding it until the mid-first 2nd century BC. Under their rule, the Phoenicians were allowed a considerable degree of autonomy and self-governance.

During the Seleucid Dynastic Wars (157–63 BC), the Phoenician cities were mainly self-governed. Many of them were fought for or over by the warring factions of the Seleucid royal family. Some Phoenician regions were under Jewish influence, after the Jews revolted and succeeded in defeating the Seleucids in 164 BC. A significant portion of the Phoenician diaspora in North Africa thus converted to Judaism in the late millennium BC. The Seleucid Kingdom was seized by Tigranes the Great of Armenia in 74/73 BC, ending the Hellenistic influence on the Levant.

== Genetic studies ==
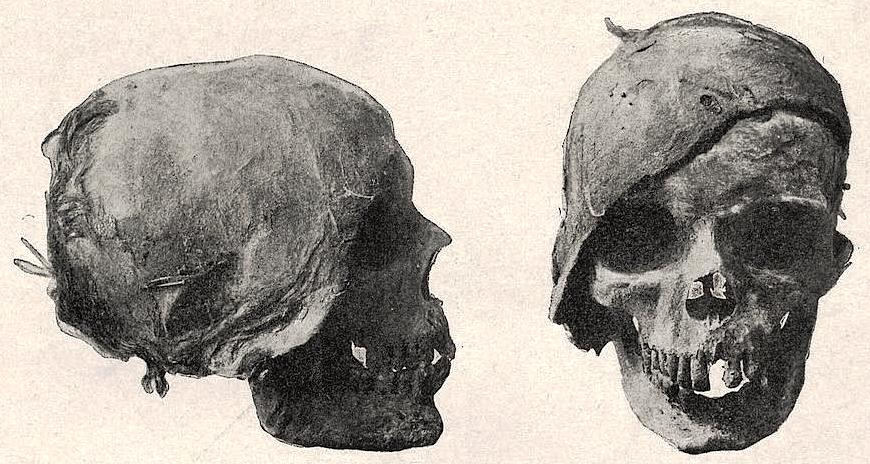
Skull of King Tabnit of Sidon (reigned c. 549 BC – c. 539 BC), now in the Istanbul Archaeology Museums

The people now known as Phoenicians were a group of ancient Semitic-speaking peoples that emerged in the Levant in at least the third millennium BC. Phoenicians did not refer themselves as "Phoenicians" in their own language—the origin of that name is the Greek word phoinix (φοῖνιξ). According to the historian and archaeologist Josephine Quinn, in spite of the often made assertion that the Phoenicians referred to themselves as "Canaanites", there is very little evidence that they used this collective self-designation. She says that the limited available evidence indicates, rather, that Phoenician-speakers identified themselves, at least in their surviving inscriptions, in terms of their native cities and of their families.

=== Autosomal DNA ===
According to a 2017 study published by the American Journal of Human Genetics, present-day Lebanese derive most of their ancestry from a Canaanite-related population, which therefore implies substantial genetic continuity in the Levant since at least the Bronze Age. More specifically, the research of geneticist Chris Tyler-Smith and his team at the Sanger Institute in Britain, who compared "sampled ancient DNA from five Canaanite people who lived 3,750 and 3,650 years ago" to modern people, revealed that 93 percent of the genetic ancestry of people in Lebanon came from the Canaanites (the other 7 percent was of a Eurasian steppe population).

In a 2020 study published in the American Journal of Human Genetics, researchers have shown that there is substantial genetic continuity in Lebanon since the Bronze Age interrupted by three significant admixture events during the Iron Age, Hellenistic, and Ottoman period. In particular, the Phoenicians can be modeled as a mixture of the local Bronze Age population (63–88%) and a population coming from the North, related to ancient Anatolians or ancient South-Eastern Europeans (12–37%). The results show that a Steppe-like ancestry, typically found in Europeans, appears in the region starting from the Iron Age.

A genetic study published in Nature Communications in April 2025 examined the remains of 196 individuals from 14 sites traditionally identified as Phoenician and Punic in the central and western Mediterranean. The results suggest that during the earlier stages of the Phoenician colonization, the Punic demographic expansion was primarily driven by the spread of people with Sicilian-Aegean ancestry, while Levantine Phoenicians made little to no genetic contribution to Punic settlements in the central and western Mediterranean. In the Mediterranean world, Punic ancestry became widespread only after 400 BC, suggesting that expanding Carthaginian influence facilitated this proliferation. However, this was a minority contributor of ancestry in all of the sampled sites, including in Carthage itself.

=== Haplogroups ===
A 2008 study led by Pierre Zalloua found that six subclades of Haplogroup J-M172 (J2)—thought to have originated between the Caucasus Mountains, Mesopotamia and the Levant—were of a "Phoenician signature" and present amongst the male populations of coastal Lebanon as well as the wider Levant (the "Phoenician Periphery"), followed by other areas of historic Phoenician settlement, spanning from Cyprus to Morocco. This deliberate sequential sampling was an attempt to develop a methodology to link the documented historical expansion of a population with a particular geographic genetic pattern or patterns. The researchers suggested that the proposed genetic signature stemmed from "a common source of related lineages rooted in Lebanon". Another study in 2006 found evidence for the genetic persistence of Phoenicians in the Spanish island of Ibiza.

In 2016, the rare U5b2c1 maternal haplogroup was identified in the DNA of a 2,500-year-old male skeleton excavated from a Punic tomb in Tunisia. The lineage of this "Young Man of Byrsa" is believed to represent early gene flow from Iberia to the Maghreb.

One 2018 study of mitochondrial lineages in Sardinia concluded that the Phoenicians were "inclusive, multicultural and featured significant female mobility", with evidence of indigenous Sardinians integrating "peacefully and permanently" with Semitic Phoenician settlers. The study also found evidence suggesting that south Europeans may have likewise settled in the area of modern Lebanon.

A 2022 analysis of maternal haplogroups from ancient samples from Punic sites of Motya and Lilibeo in Sicily, indicates that the Sicilian Phoenicians shared genetic similarities with Bronze Age samples from the Iberian Peninsula, Sardinia and Italy, and are not particularly close to other Phoenicians from Sardinia and the Iberian islands. The Phoenicians in Motya shared lesser genetic similarities with samples from Bronze Age Levant.

== Economy ==
=== Trade ===
Major Phoenician trade networks (c. 1200–800 BC)

The Phoenicians served as intermediaries between the disparate civilizations that spanned the Mediterranean and Near East, facilitating the exchange of goods and knowledge, culture, and religious traditions. Their expansive and enduring trade network is credited with laying the foundations of an economically and culturally cohesive Mediterranean, which would be continued by the Greeks and especially the Romans.

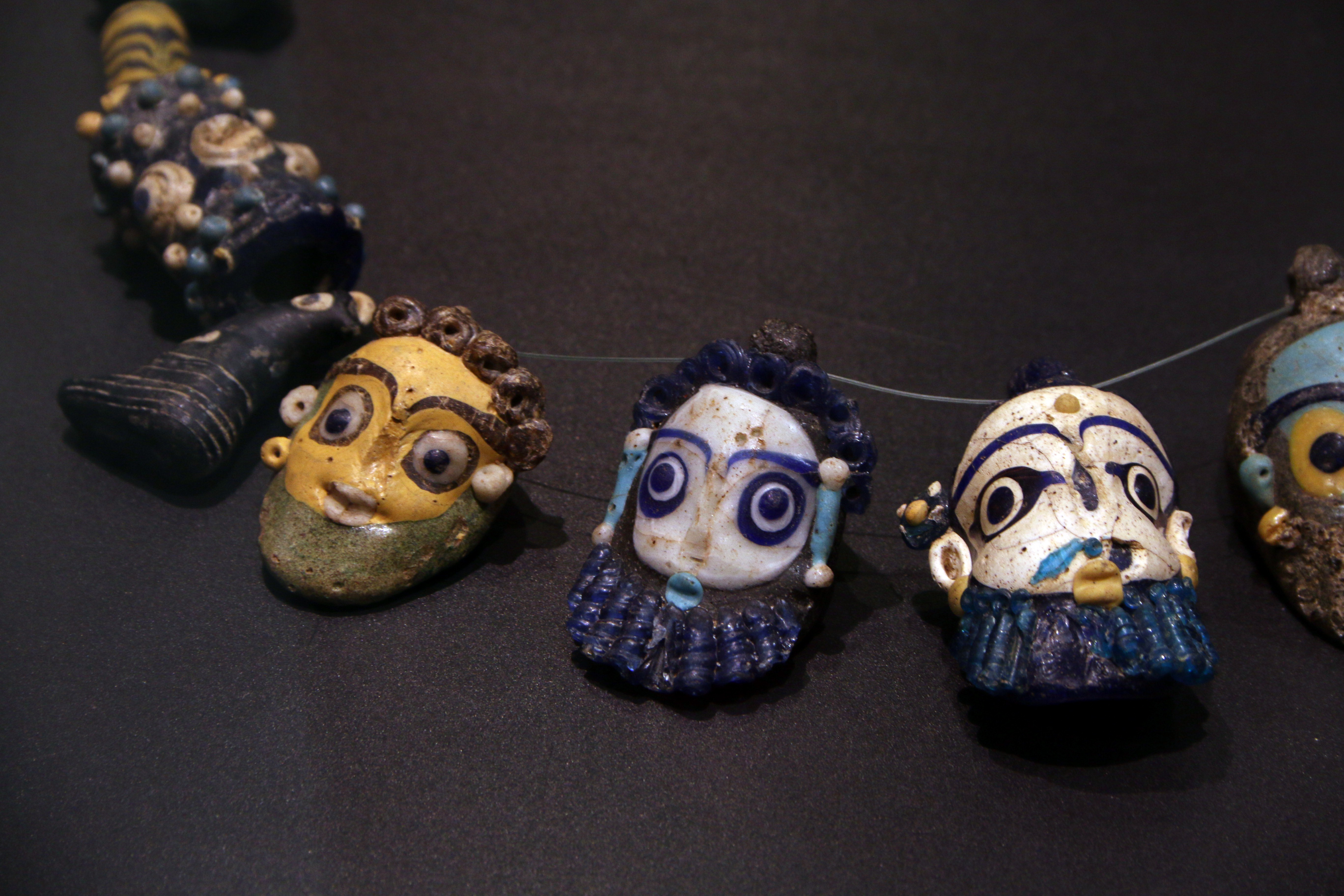
Phoenician faces. Glass from Olbia, 4th century BC. The bold pools of color and detailed hair give a Greek impression.

Phoenician ties with the Greeks ran deep. The earliest verified relationship appears to have begun with the Minoan civilization on Crete (1950–1450 BC), which together with the Mycenaean civilization (1600–1100 BC) is considered the progenitor of classical Greece.

Starting in the 8th century BC, the Phoenicians sold logs of cedar for significant sums, and wine to Egypt. The wine trade with Egypt is vividly documented by shipwrecks discovered in 1997 in the open sea 50 kilometres (30 mi) west of Ascalon. Pottery kilns at Tyre and Sarepta produced the large terracotta jars used for transporting wine. From Egypt, the Phoenicians bought Nubian gold.

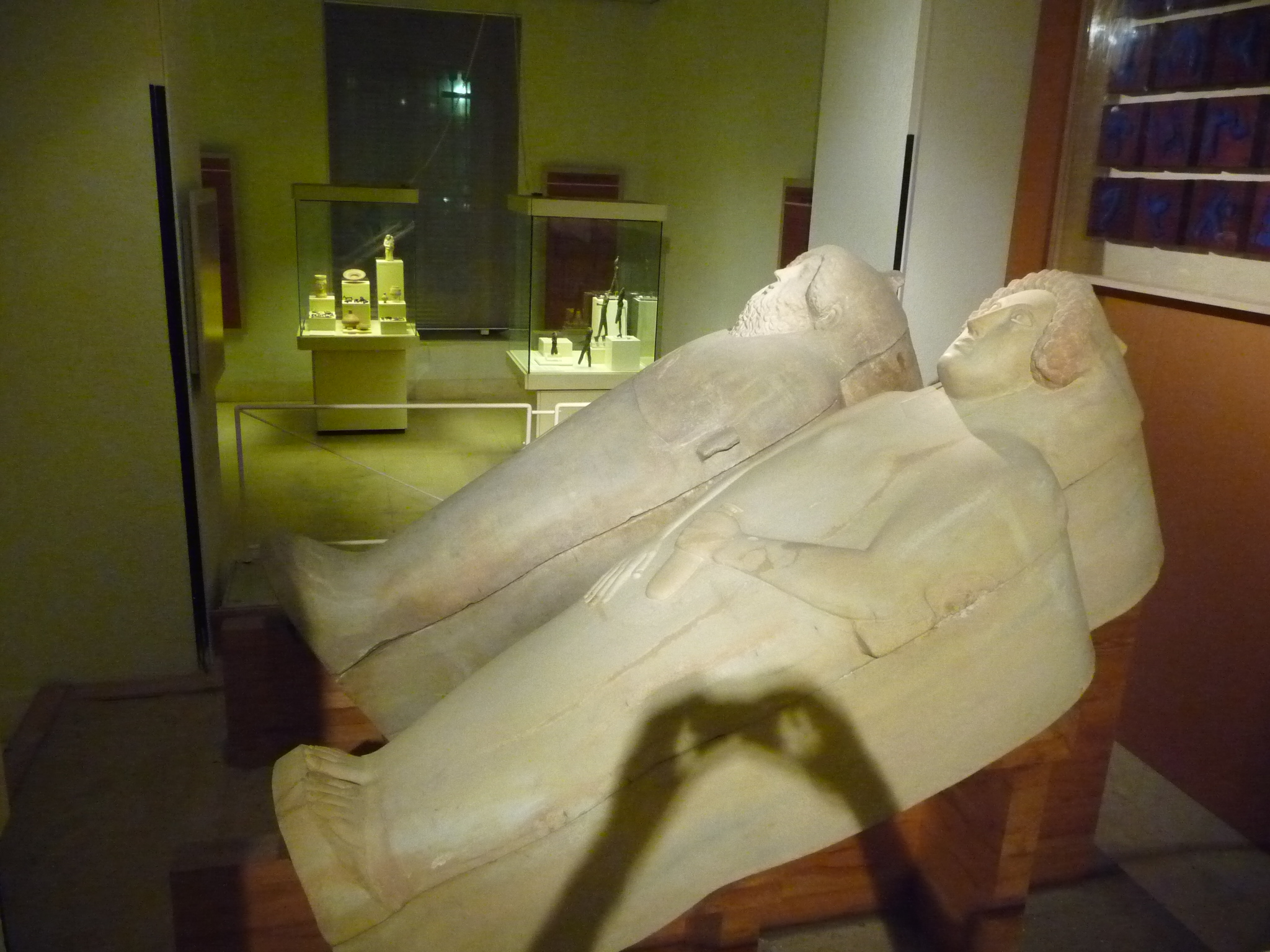
Phoenician sarcophagi found in Cádiz, Spain, thought to have been imported from the Phoenician homeland around Sidon. Archaeological Museum of Cádiz.

From elsewhere, they obtained other materials, perhaps the most crucial being silver, mostly from Sardinia and the Iberian Peninsula. Tin for making bronze "may have been acquired from Galicia by way of the Atlantic coast of southern Spain; alternatively, it may have come from northern Europe (Cornwall or Brittany) via the Rhone valley and coastal Massalia". Strabo states that there was a highly lucrative Phoenician trade with Britain for tin via the Cassiterides, whose location is unknown but may have been off the northwest coast of the Iberian Peninsula.

=== Industry ===
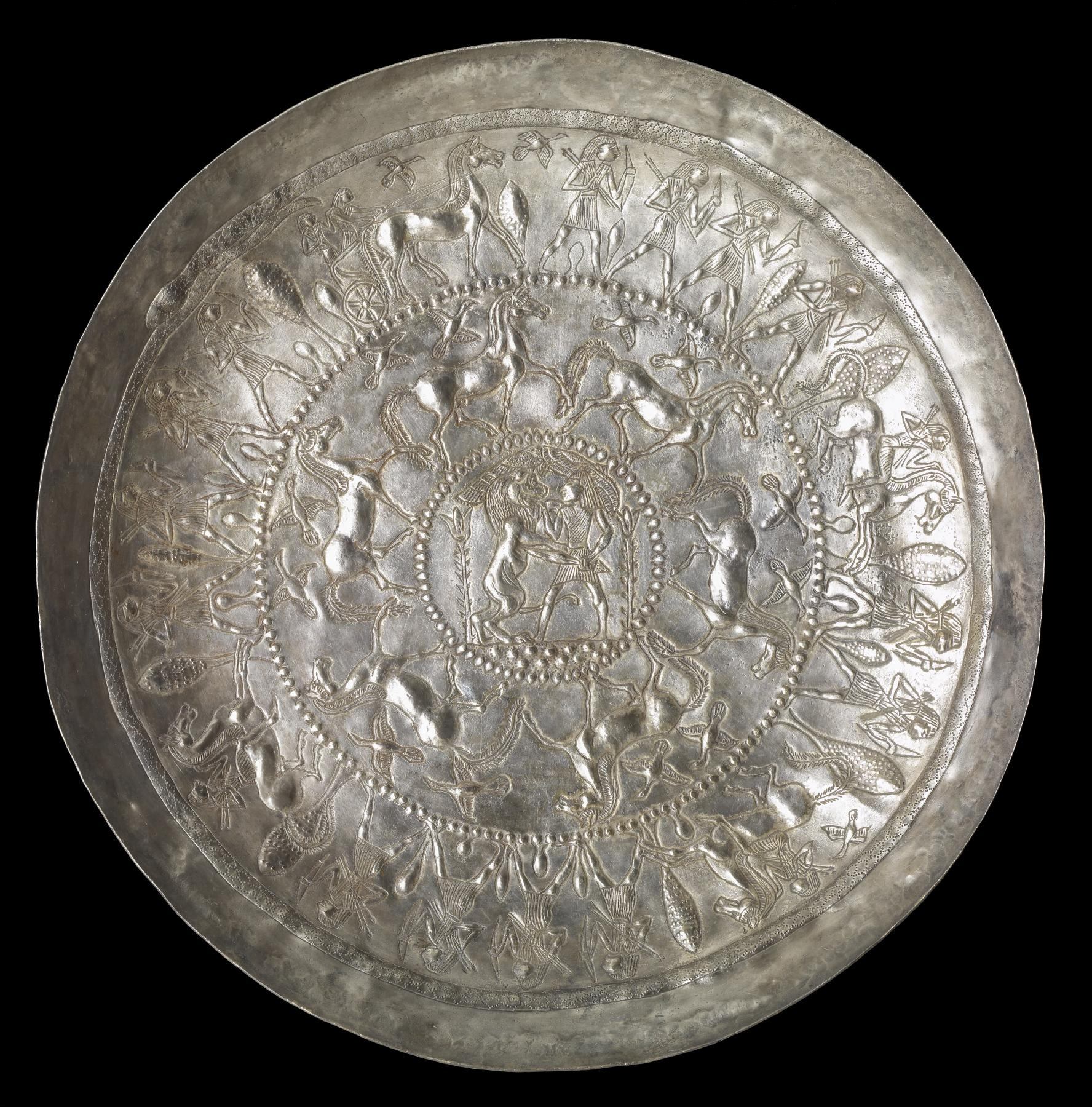
Phoenician metal bowl with hunting scene (8th century BC). The clothing and hairstyle of the figures are Egyptian. At the same time, the subject matter of the central scene conforms with the Mesopotamian theme of combat between man and beast. Phoenician artisans frequently adapted the styles of neighboring cultures.

Phoenicia lacked considerable natural resources other than its cedar wood. Timber was probably the earliest and most lucrative source of wealth; neither Egypt nor Mesopotamia had adequate wood sources. Unable to rely solely on this limited resource, the Phoenicians developed an industrial base manufacturing a variety of goods for both everyday and luxury use. The Phoenicians developed or mastered techniques such as glass-making, engraved and chased metalwork (including bronze, iron, and gold), ivory carving, and woodwork.

The Phoenicians were early pioneers in mass production, and sold a variety of items in bulk. They set up trade networks to market their glassware and became its leading source in antiquity, shipping flasks, beads, and other glass objects across the Mediterranean in their vessels. Excavations of colonies in Spain suggest they also used the potter's wheel. Their exposure to a wide variety of cultures allowed them to manufacture goods for specific markets. The Iliad suggests Phoenician clothing and metal goods were highly prized by the Greeks. Specialized goods were designed specifically for wealthier clientele, including ivory reliefs and plaques, carved clam shells, sculpted amber, and finely detailed and painted ostrich eggs.

==== Tyrian purple ====
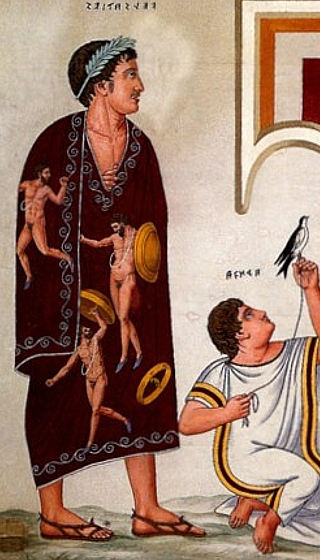
An Etruscan tomb (c. 350 BC) depicting a man wearing an all-purple toga picta

The most prized Phoenician goods were fabrics dyed with Tyrian purple, which formed a major part of Phoenician wealth. The violet-purple dye derived from the hypobranchial gland of the Murex marine snail, once profusely available in coastal waters of the eastern Mediterranean Sea but now exploited to local extinction. Phoenicians may have discovered the dye as early as 1750 BC. The Phoenicians established a second production center for the dye in Mogador, in present-day Morocco.

The Phoenicians' exclusive command over the production and trade of the dye, combined with the labor-intensive extraction process, made it very expensive. Tyrian purple subsequently became associated with the upper classes. It soon became a status symbol in several civilizations, most notably among the Romans. Assyrian tribute records from the Phoenicians include "garments of brightly colored stuff" that most likely included Tyrian purple. While the designs, ornamentation, and embroidery used in Phoenician textiles were well-regarded, the techniques and specific descriptions are unknown.

==== Mining ====
Mining operations in the Phoenician homeland were limited; iron was the only metal of any worth. The first large-scale mining operations by Phoenicians probably occurred in Cyprus, principally for copper. Sardinia may have been colonized almost exclusively for its mineral resources; Phoenician settlements were concentrated in the southern parts of the island, close to sources of copper and lead. Piles of scoria and copper ingots, which appear to predate Roman occupation, suggest the Phoenicians mined and processed metals on the island. The Iberian Peninsula was the richest source of numerous metals in antiquity, including gold, silver, copper, iron, tin, and lead. The output of silver during the Phoenician and Carthaginian occupation there was enormous. The Carthaginians relied on slave labor almost exclusively in their mining operations, and according to Rawlinson, because they likely continued the established practices of their predecessors in Iberia, the Phoenicians themselves probably also used slave labor.

==== Agriculture ====
Per Aubet, the streams necessary to provide irrigation in Phoenicia for agriculture during the spring rainy season were found only on the coastal plain. The drastic political and climatic changes that occurred around 1200 BC resulted in a concentration of people in the region. During the 10th century BC, the Phoenician cities engineered irrigation systems to grow crops on the fertile coastal strip and built cisterns to supply the urban centers with drinking water. Nevertheless, the cereal crops grown on the mountain slopes could not meet the food requirements of the ever-growing population concentrated on the coastal plain and Phoenicia consequently suffered grain shortages.

The most notable agricultural product was wine, which the Phoenicians helped propagate across the Mediterranean. The common grape vine may have been domesticated by the Phoenicians or Canaanites, although it most likely arrived from Transcaucasia via trade routes across Mesopotamia or the Black Sea. Vines grew readily in the coastal Levant, and wine was exported to Egypt as early as the Old Kingdom period (2686–2134 BC). Wine played an important part in Phoenician religion, serving as the principal beverage for offerings and sacrifice. An excavation of a small Phoenician town south of Sidon uncovered a wine factory used from at least the seventh century BC, which is believed to have been aimed for an overseas market. To prevent oxidation of their contents, amphorae were sealed with a disk plug made of pinewood and a mixture of resin and clay.

The Phoenicians established vineyards and wineries in their colonies in Morocco, Tunisia, Sicily, France, and Spain, and may have taught winemaking to some of their trading partners. The ancient Iberians began producing wine from local grape varieties following their encounter with the Phoenicians. Iberian cultivars subsequently formed the basis of most western European wine.

==== Shipbuilding ====
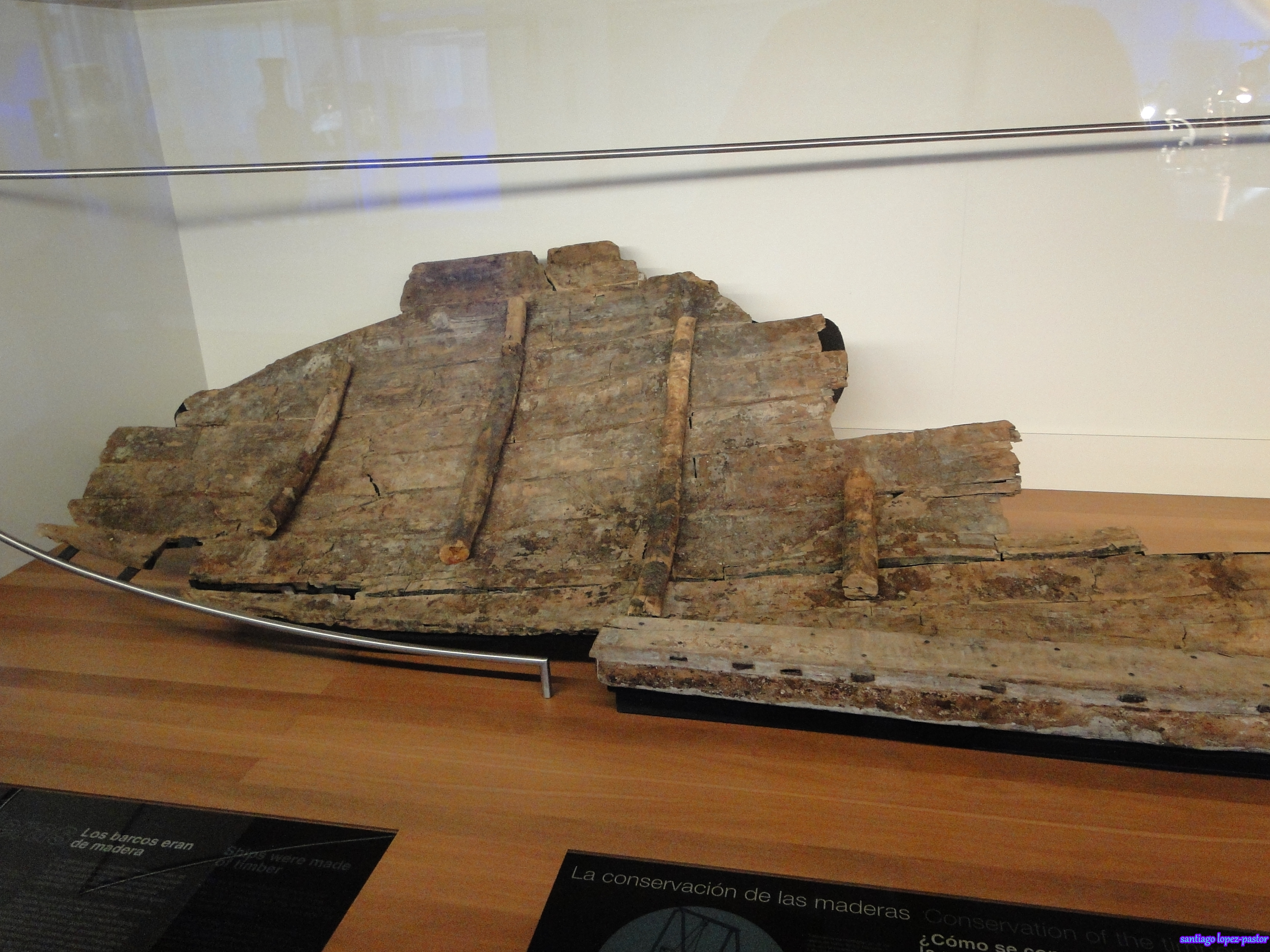
Mortise and tenon joinery in the Mazarron 1 Phoenician shipwreck. Phoenicians pioneered the pegged mortise and tenon joinery, which came to be known as Phoenician joints

As early as 1200 BC, texts from Ugarit suggest that Canaanite merchant ships were capable of carrying cargoes weighing up to 450 tons. During the first millennium BC, the cargo capacity of Phoenician merchant ships ranged between 100 and 500 tons. The Phoenicians pioneered the use of locked mortise and tenon joints, known as Phoenician joints, to secure the planking of ship hulls underwater. This method involved cutting mortises into adjoining planks and inserting wooden tenons to join them, which were then secured with dowels. Examples of this technique include the Uluburun shipwreck (c. 1320 BC) and the Cape Gelidonya shipwreck (c. 1200 BC). The innovation spread across the Mediterranean and influenced Greek and Roman shipbuilding, with the Romans referring to it as coagmenta punicana.

The Phoenicians were possibly the first to introduce the bireme. Fernand Braudel cites the bas-relief carvings on the walls of the palace of Nineveh which depict the Tyrian fleet fleeing the port of Tyre before the city was attacked by Sennacherib c. 700 BC. The Phoenicians sailed their biremes close to shore and only in fair weather. They have also been credited with developing the trireme by scholars such as Lucien Basch. Referring to archaeological evidence of ships depicted in the Nineveh relief, cylinder seals, and Phoenician coins, he argues that the trireme was invented in Sidon around 700 BC and later adopted by the Greeks. The classicist J. S. Morrison, a student of the trireme, quotes Thucydides' statement that triereis, or triremes, were said to have been built first at Corinth in Greece. Although he allows that Phoenicians of 701 BC were credited by the sculptor of the Nineveh relief with one type of the vessel, interpreted by Morrison as having three banks of oarsmen on each side in three tiers with the uppermost tier unmanned, he argues that there is no good reason why Thucydides' account should not be believed. The trieme was regarded as the most advanced vessel in the ancient Mediterranean world.

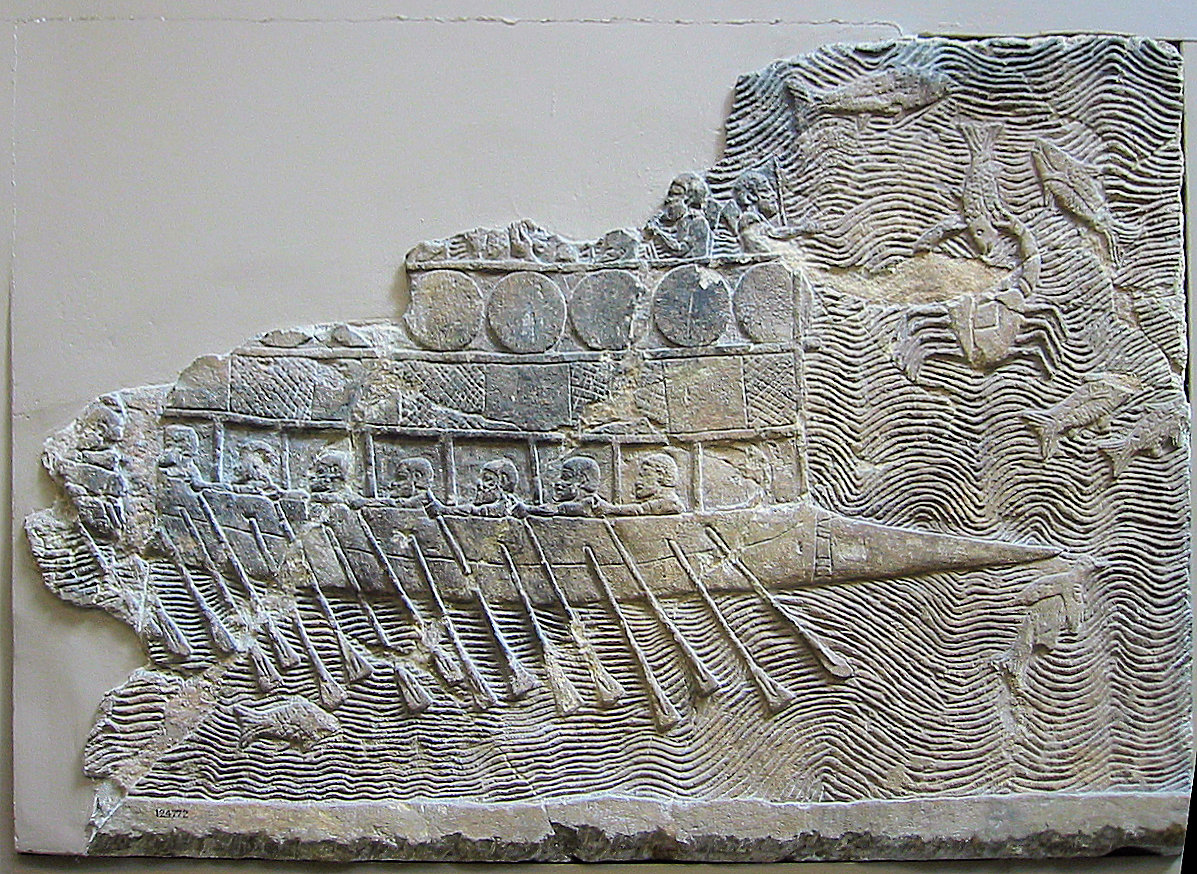
Warship with two rows of oars, in relief from Nineveh (c. 700 BC)

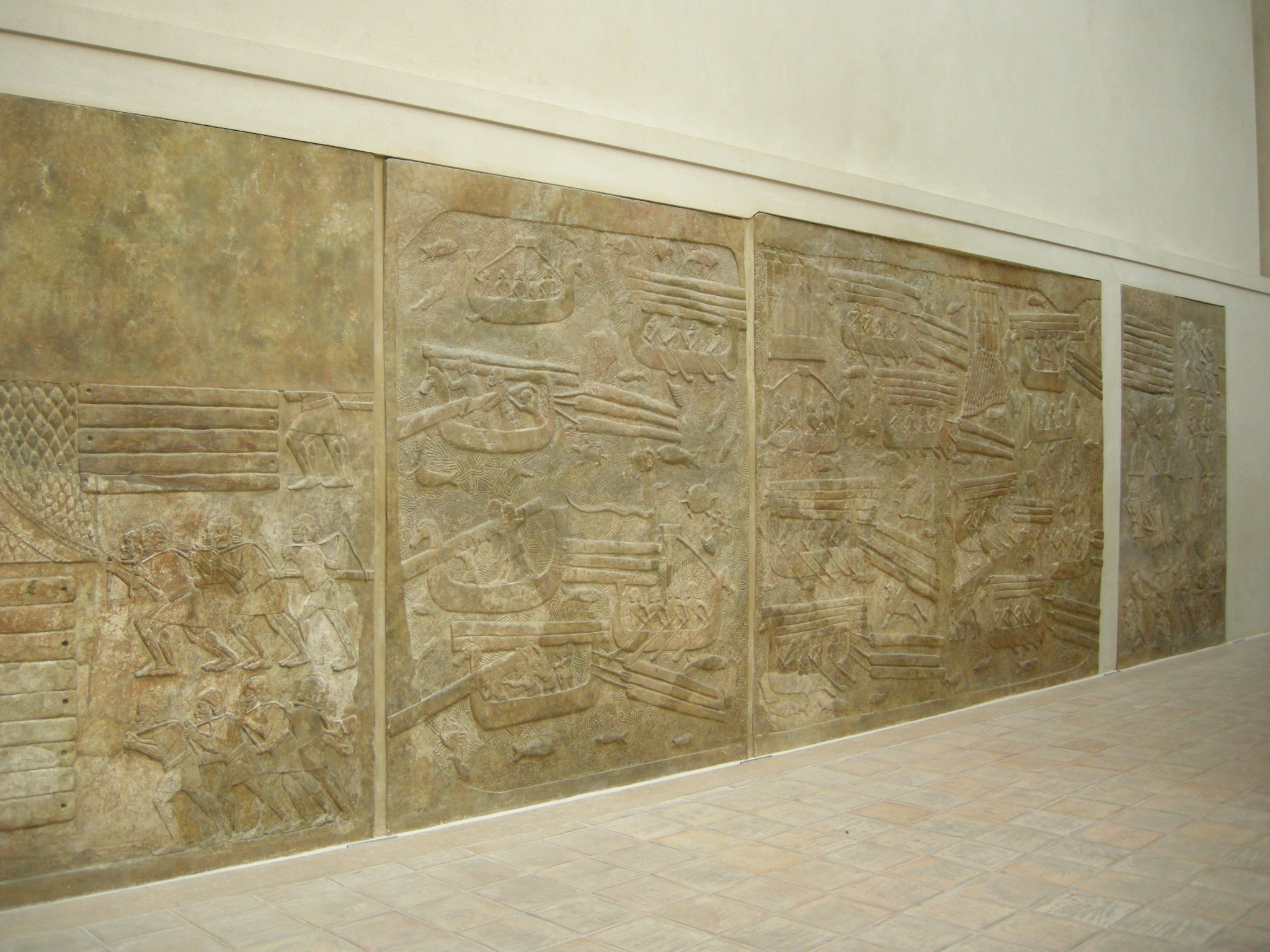
The Timber Transportation relief at the Louvre

Two Assyrian representations of ships, which could represent Phoenician vessels

The Phoenicians developed several other maritime inventions. The amphora, a type of container used for both dry and liquid goods, was an ancient Phoenician invention that became a standardized measurement of volume for close to two thousand years. The remnants of self-cleaning artificial harbors (cothons) have been discovered in Sidon, Tyre, Atlit, and Acre. The first example of admiralty law also appears in the Levant. The Phoenicians continued to contribute to cartography into the Iron Age.

In 2014, a 12 metres (39 ft) long Phoenician trading ship was found near Gozo island in Malta. Dated 700 BC, it is one of the oldest wrecks found in the Mediterranean. Fifty amphorae, used to contain wine and oil, were scattered nearby.

== Important cities and colonies ==
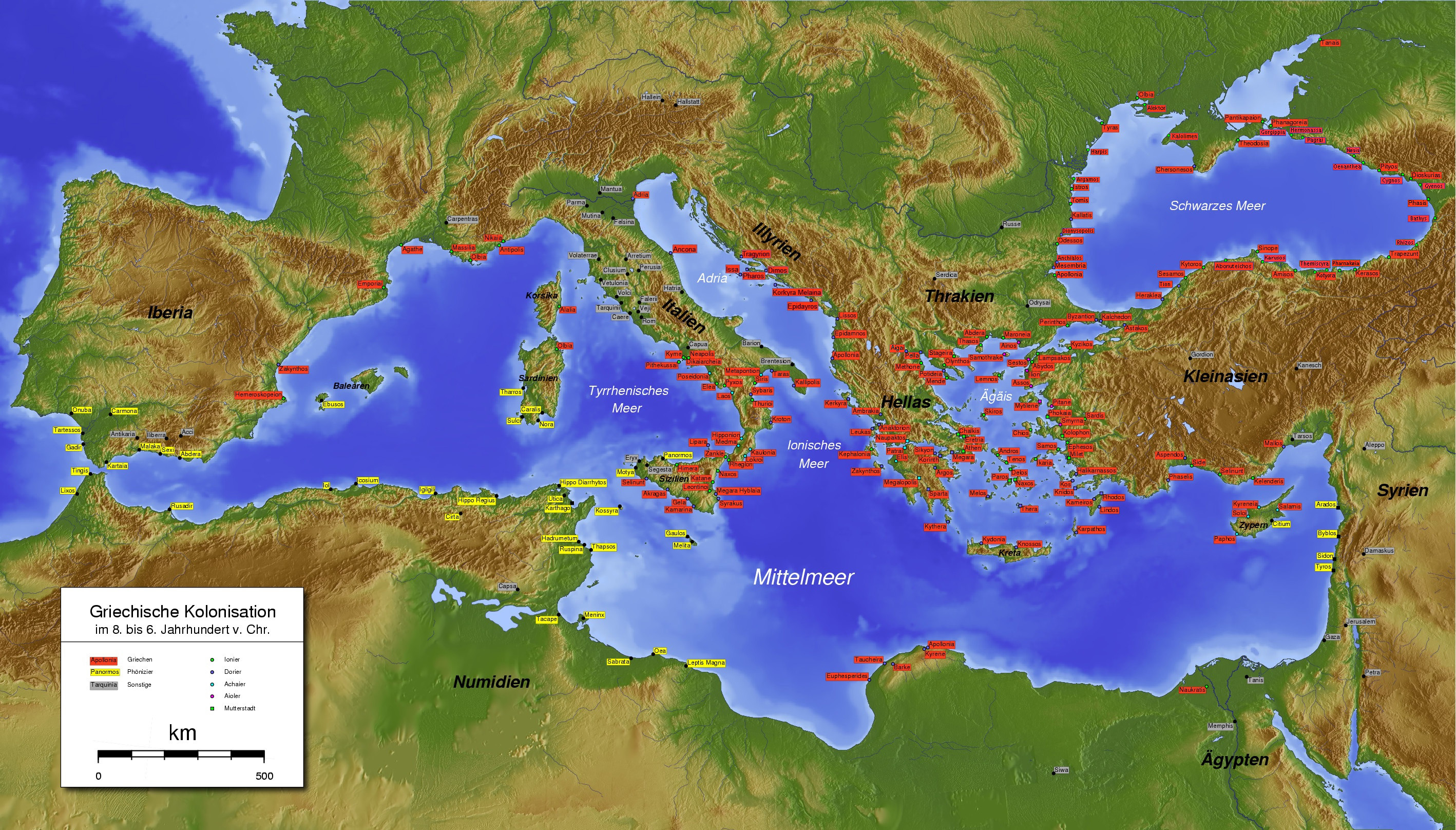
Map of Phoenician (yellow labels) and Greek (red labels) colonies around 8th to 6th century BC (with German legend)

The Phoenicians were not a nation in the political sense. However, they were organized into independent city-states that shared a common language and culture. The leading city-states were Tyre, Sidon, and Byblos. Rivalries were expected, but armed conflict was rare.

Numerous other cities existed in the Levant alone, many probably unknown, including Beiruta (modern Beirut) Ampi, Amia, Arqa, Baalbek, Botrys, Sarepta, and Tripolis. From the late tenth century BC, the Phoenicians established commercial outposts throughout the Mediterranean, with Tyre founding colonies in Cyprus, Sardinia, Iberia, the Balearic Islands, Sicily, Malta, Morocco, and Tunisia. Later colonies were established beyond the Straits of Gibraltar, particularly on the Atlantic coast of Iberia. The Phoenicians may have explored the Canary Islands and the British Isles. Phoenician settlements were primarily concentrated in Cyprus, Sicily, Sardinia, Malta, the northwest Maghreb, the Balearic Islands, and southeastern Iberia.

=== Phoenician colonization ===
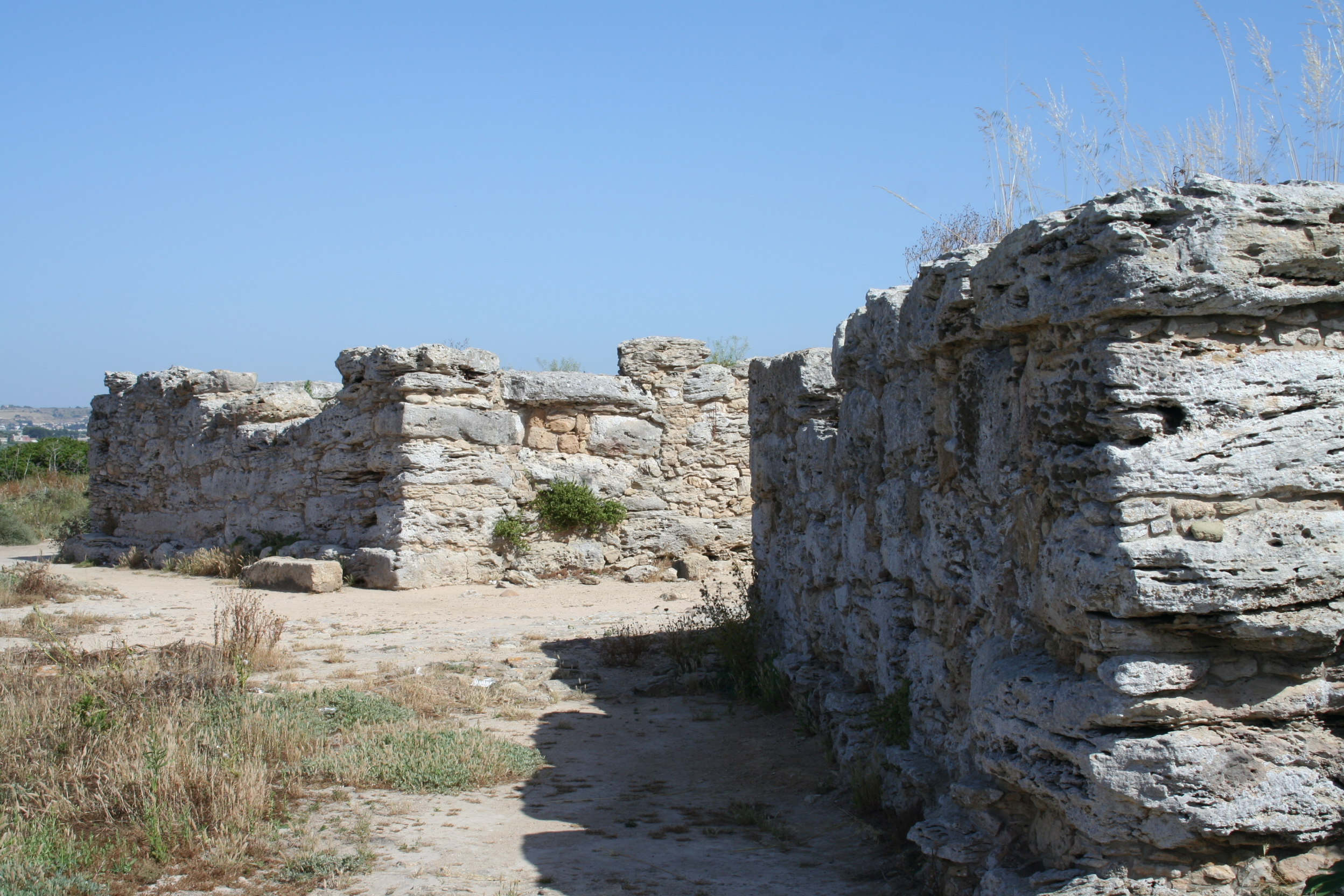
Ruins of the ancient Phoenician city of Motya, Sicily, present-day Italy

To facilitate their commercial ventures, the Phoenicians established numerous colonies and trading posts along the coasts of the Mediterranean. Phoenician city-states generally lacked the numbers or even the desire to expand their territories. Few settlements had more than 1,000 inhabitants; only Carthage, Tangier, and nearby settlements in the western Mediterranean of the Maghreb and Iberia would grow larger. A major motivating factor was competition with the Greeks, who began expanding throughout the Mediterranean basin during the same period. Though largely peaceful rivals, their respective settlements in Crete and Sicily did clash intermittently.

The earliest Phoenician settlements outside the Levant were on Cyprus and Crete, gradually moving westward towards Corsica, the Balearic Islands, Sardinia, and Sicily, as well as in the Mediterranean Maghreb and Iberia, in Tangier and Málaga. The first Phoenician colonies in the western Mediterranean were along the Mediterranean coast of the Maghreb, and on Sicily, Sardinia and the Balearic Islands. Tyre led the way in settling or controlling coastal areas.

Phoenician colonies were fairly autonomous. At most, they were expected to send annual tribute to their mother city, usually in the context of a religious offering. However, in the seventh century BC the western colonies came under the control of Carthage, which was exercised directly through appointed magistrates. Carthage continued to send annual tribute to Tyre for some time after its independence.

== Society and culture ==
Because very little of the Phoenicians' writings have survived, much of what is known about their culture and society comes from accounts by contemporary civilizations or inferences from archaeological discoveries. According to the historian Philip C. Schmitz, beginning in the so-called Greek Dark Ages that followed the collapse of the Mycenaean civilization, the Greek word Phoinikoi came to be used for those people who inhabited the urban centers on the eastern Mediterranean coast. The populations of the Canaanite cities from coastal Syria and Lebanon to the northern coast of Palestine, including Beirut, Byblos, Sidon, Tripoli, and Tyre, could be deemed "Phoenician". These Canaanite populations were similar in their social organization, economic enterprises, religious beliefs and practices, and their material culture. The language they spoke might be denominated by the name of the particular city, or simply be called "Phoenician".

=== Politics and government ===
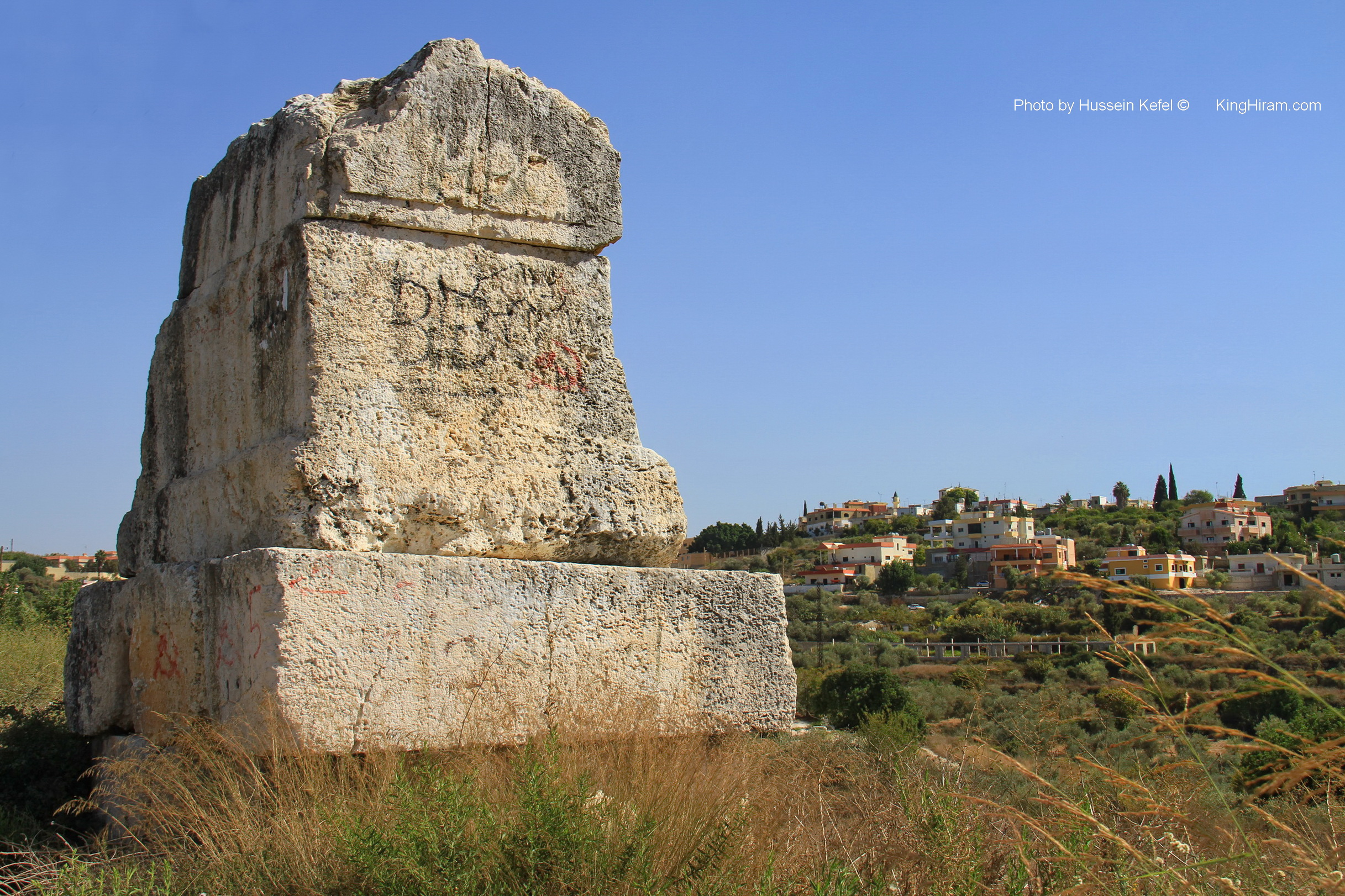
Tomb of King Hiram I of Tyre, located in the village of Hanaouay, in southern Lebanon

The Phoenician city-states were highly independent, competing with each other. Formal alliances between city-states were rare. The relative power and influence of city-states varied over time. Sidon was dominant between the 12th and 11th centuries BC and influenced its neighbors. However, by the tenth century BC, Tyre rose to become the most powerful city.

At least in its earlier stages, Phoenician society was highly stratified and predominantly monarchical. Hereditary kings usually governed with absolute power over civic, commercial, and religious affairs. They often relied upon senior officials from the noble and merchant classes; the priesthood was a distinct class, usually of royal lineage or leading merchant families. The King was considered a representative of the gods and carried many obligations and duties concerning religious processions and rituals. Priests were thus highly influential and often became intertwined with the royal family.

Phoenician kings did not commemorate their reign through sculptures or monuments. Their wealth, power, and accomplishments were usually conveyed through ornate sarcophagi, like that of Ahiram of Byblos. The Phoenicians kept records of their rulers in tomb inscriptions, which are among the few primary sources still available. Historians have determined a clear line of succession over centuries for some city-states, notably Byblos and Tyre.

Starting as early as 15th century BC, Phoenician leaders were "advised by councils or assemblies which gradually took greater power". In the sixth century BC, during the period of Babylonian rule, Tyre briefly adopted a system of government consisting of a pair of judges with authority roughly equivalent to the Roman consul, known as sufetes (shophets), who were chosen from the most powerful noble families and served short terms.

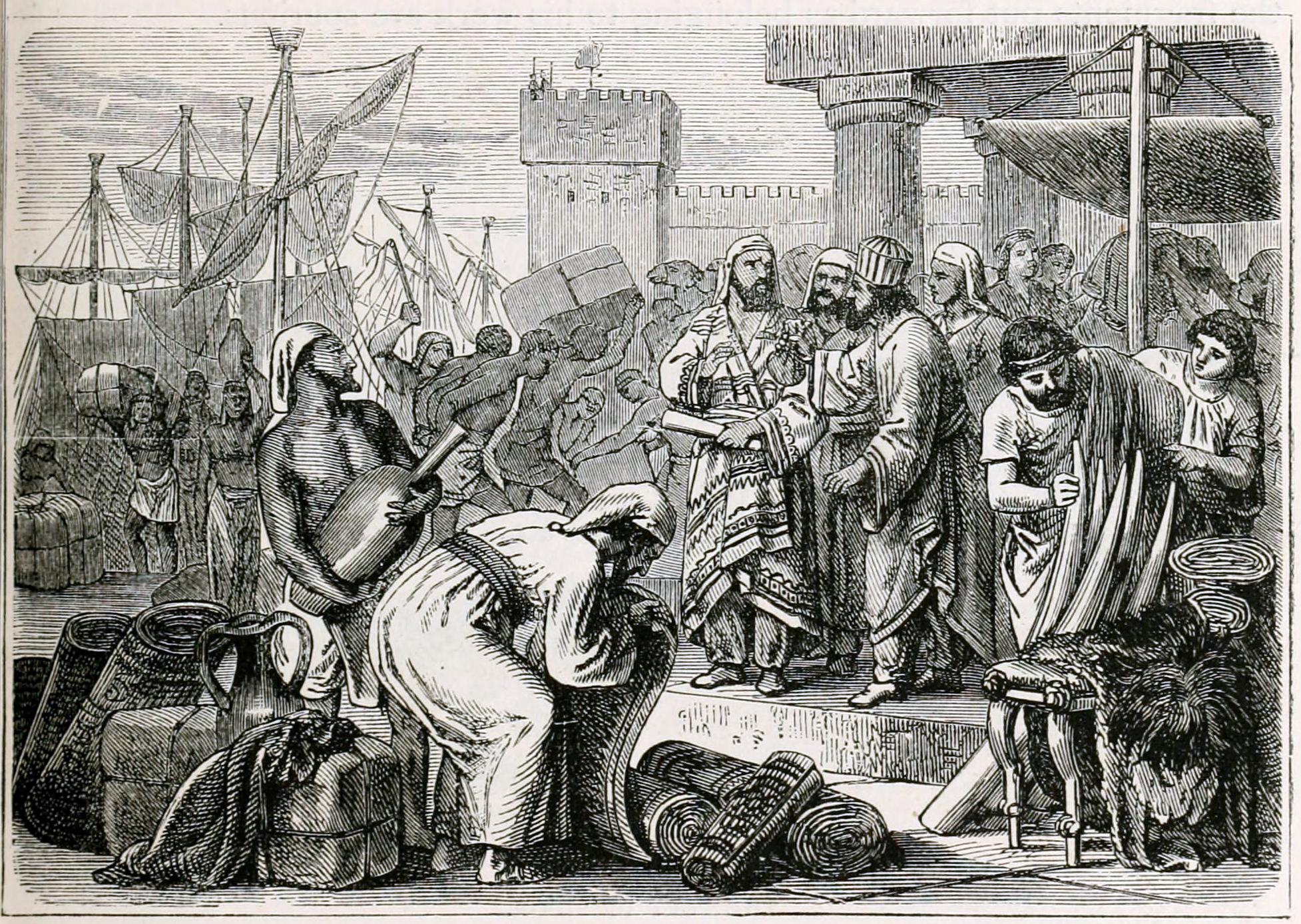
19th-century depiction of Phoenician sailors and merchants. The importance of trade to the Phoenician economy led to a gradual sharing of power between the King and assemblies of merchant families.

In the fourth century BC, when the armies of Alexander the Great approached Tyre, they were met not by its King but by representatives of the commonwealth of the city. Similarly, historians at the time describe the "inhabitants" or "the people" of Sidon making peace with Alexander. When the Macedonians sought to appoint a new king over Sidon, the citizens nominated their candidate.

=== Law and administration ===
After the King and council, the two most important political positions in virtually every Phoenician city-state were governor and commander of the army. Details regarding the duties of these offices are sparse. However, it is known that the governor was responsible for collecting taxes, implementing decrees, supervising judges, and ensuring the administration of law and justice. As warfare was rare among the most mercantile Phoenicians, the army's commander was generally responsible for ensuring the defense and security of the city-state and its hinterlands.

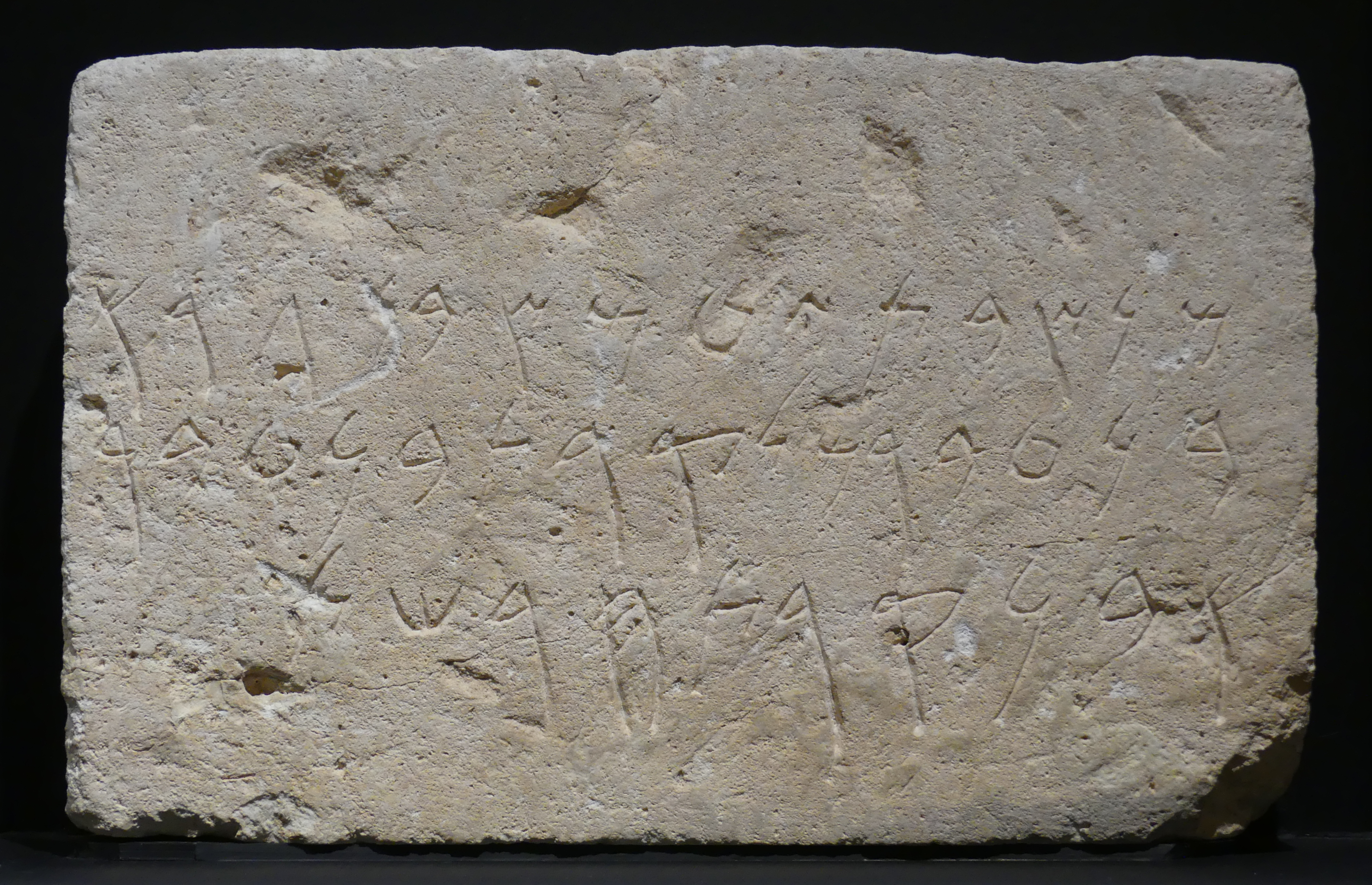
Stela from Tyre with Phoenician inscriptions (c. 4th century BC). National Museum of Beirut.

The Phoenicians had a system of courts and judges that resolved disputes and punished crimes based on a semi-codified body of laws and traditions. Laws were implemented by the state and were the responsibility of the ruler and certain designated officials. Like other Levantine societies, laws were harsh and biased, reflecting the social stratification of society. The murder of a commoner was treated as less severe than that of a nobleman, and the upper classes had the most rights; the wealthy often escaped punishment by paying a fine. Free men of any class could represent themselves in court and had more rights than women and children, while slaves had no rights. Men could often deflect punishment to their wives, children, or slaves, even having them serve their sentence in their place. Lawyers eventually emerged as a profession for those who could not plead their case.

As in neighboring societies at the time, penalties for crimes were often severe, usually reflecting the principle of reciprocity; for example, the killing of a slave would be punished by having the offender's slave killed. Imprisonment was rare, with fines, exile, punishment, and execution the main remedies.

=== Military ===
As with most aspects of Phoenician civilization, there are few records of their military or approach to warfare. Compared to most of their neighbors, the Phoenicians generally had little interest in conquest and were relatively peaceful. The wealth and prosperity of all their city-states rested on foreign trade, which required good relations and a certain degree of mutual trust. Each city had an army commander in charge of a defensive garrison. However, the specifics of the role, or city defense, are unknown.

=== Language ===
The Phoenician language was a member of the Canaanite branch of the Northwest Semitic languages. Its descendant language spoken in the Carthaginian Empire is termed Punic. Punic was still spoken in the fifth century AD and known to St. Augustine of Hippo.

==== Alphabet ====
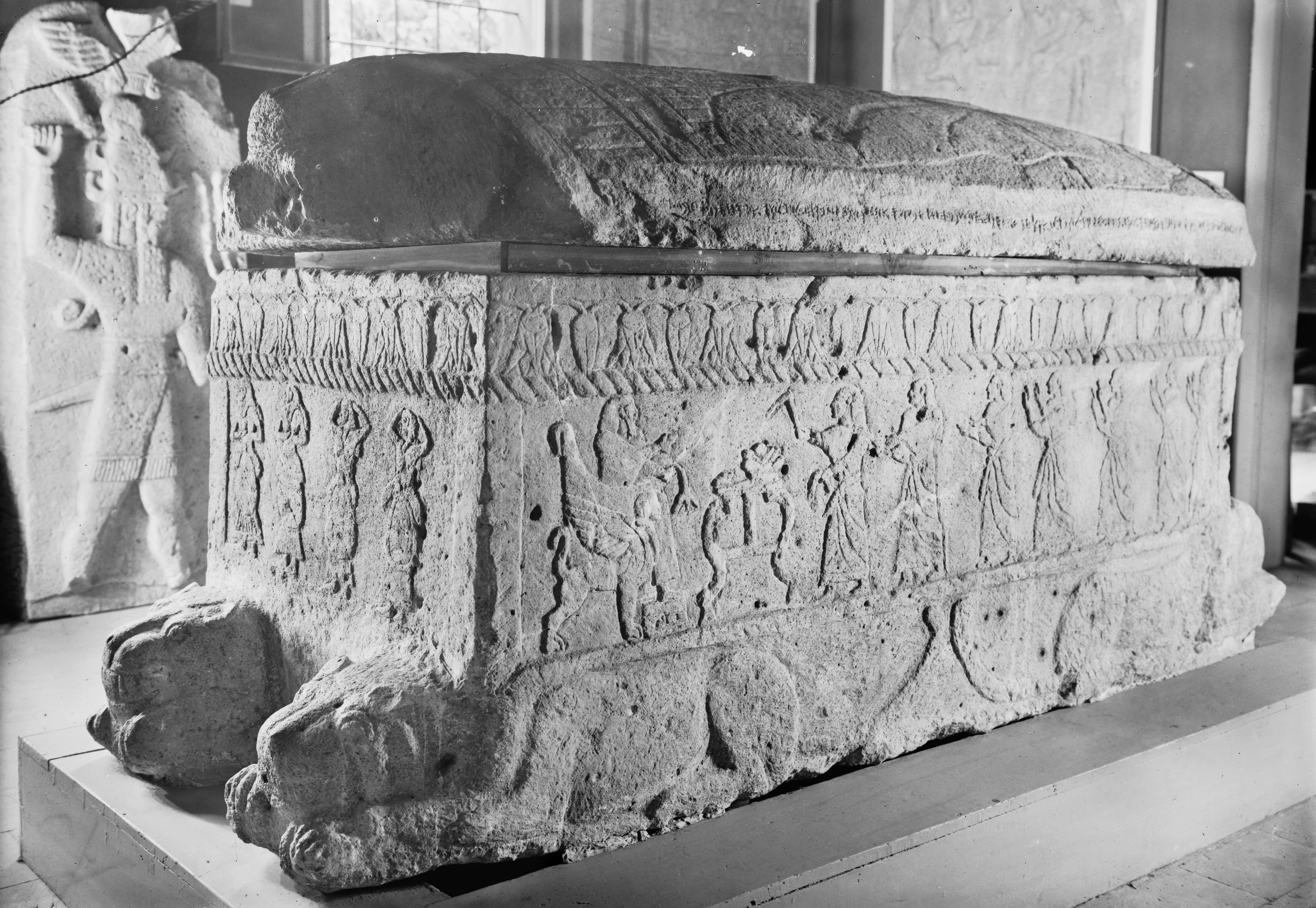
Sarcophagus of Ahiram, which bears the oldest inscription of the Phoenician alphabet. National Museum of Beirut.

Around 1050 BC, the Phoenicians developed a script for writing their own language. The Canaanite-Phoenician alphabet consists of 22 letters, all consonants (and is thus strictly an abjad). It is believed to be a continuation of the Proto-Sinaitic (or Proto-Canaanite) script attested in the Sinai and in Canaan in the Late Bronze Age. Through their maritime trade, the Phoenicians spread the use of the alphabet to Anatolia, North Africa, and Europe. The name Phoenician is by convention given to inscriptions beginning around 1050 BC, because Phoenician, Hebrew, and other Canaanite dialects were largely indistinguishable before that time. Phoenician inscriptions are found in Lebanon, Syria, Israel, Palestine, Cyprus and other locations, as late as the early centuries of the Christian era.

The alphabet was adopted and modified by the Greeks probably in the eighth century BC. This most likely did not occur in a single instance but via the drawn out process of long-term commercial exchange. According to Alessandro Pierattini, the Apollo sanctuary at Eretria is considered one of the places where the Greeks might have first adopted the Phoenician alphabet. The legendary Phoenician hero Cadmus is credited with bringing the alphabet to Greece, but it is more plausible that Phoenician immigrants brought it to Crete, whence it gradually diffused northwards.

=== Art ===
Phoenician art was largely centered on ornamental objects, particularly jewelry, pottery, glassware, and reliefs. Large sculptures were rare; figurines were more common. Phoenician goods have been found from Spain and Morocco to Russia and Iraq; much of what is known about Phoenician art is based on excavations outside Phoenicia proper. Phoenician art was highly influenced by many cultures, primarily Egypt, Greece, and Assyria. Greek inspiration was particularly pronounced in pottery, while Egyptian themes were most reflected in bronze and ivory work.

Phoenician art also differed from its contemporaries in its continuance of Bronze Age conventions well into the Iron Age, such as terracotta masks. Phoenician artisans were known for their skill with wood, ivory, bronze, and textiles. In the Old Testament, a craftsman from Tyre is commissioned to build and decorate the legendary Solomon's Temple in Jerusalem, which "presupposes a well-developed and highly respected craft industry in Phoenicia by the mid-tenth century BC". The Iliad mentions the embroidered robes of Priam's wife, Hecabe, as "the work of Sidonian women" and describes a mixing bowl of chased silver as "a masterpiece of Sidonian craftsmanship". The Assyrians appeared to have valued Phoenician ivory work in particular, collecting vast quantities in their palaces.

Phoenician art appears to have been indelibly tied to Phoenician commercial interests. They have crafted goods to appeal to particular trading partners, distinguishing not only different cultures but even socioeconomic status classes.

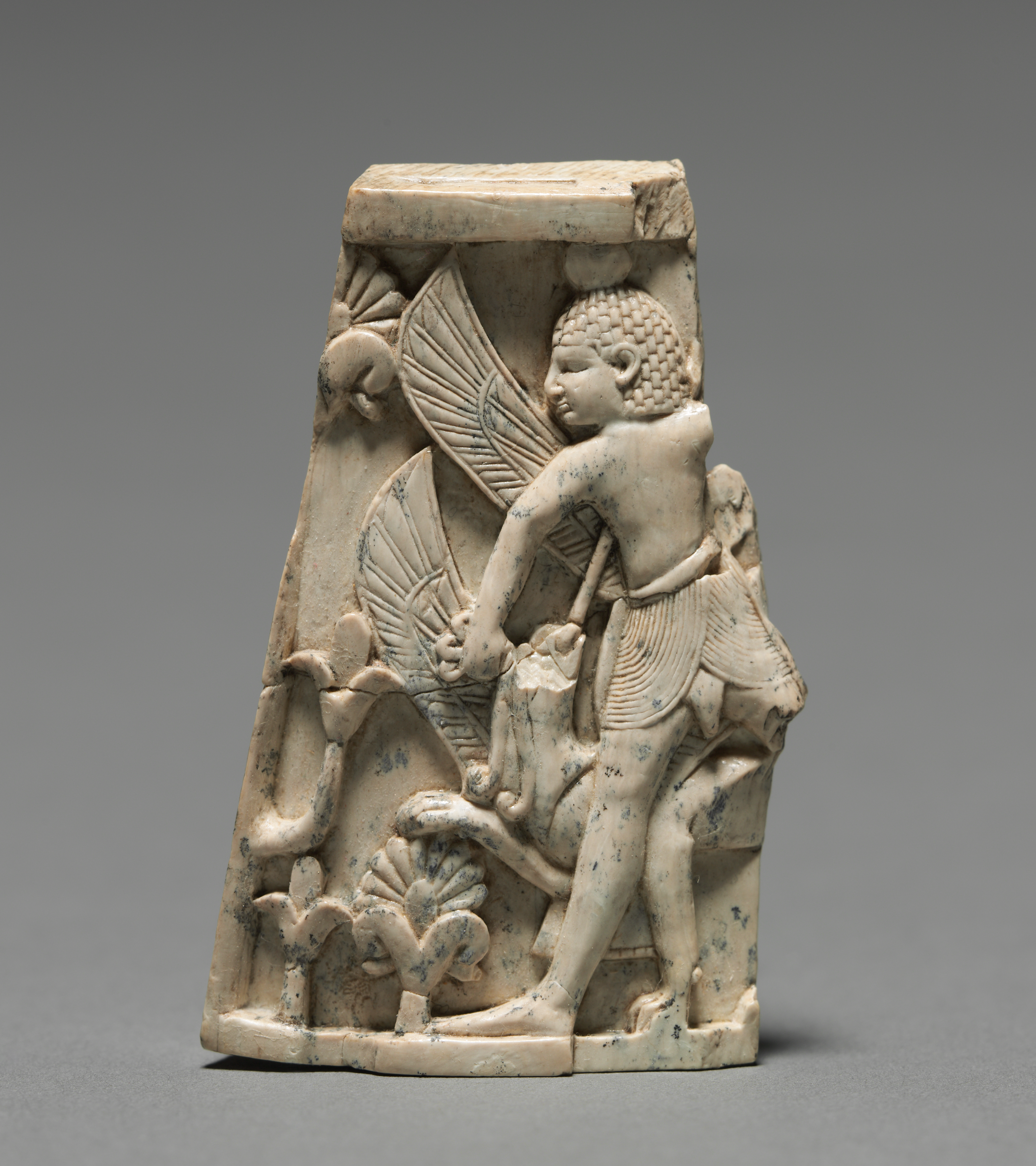
Decorative plaque which depicts a fighting of man and griffin; 900–800 BC; Nimrud ivories; Cleveland Museum of Art (Ohio, US)

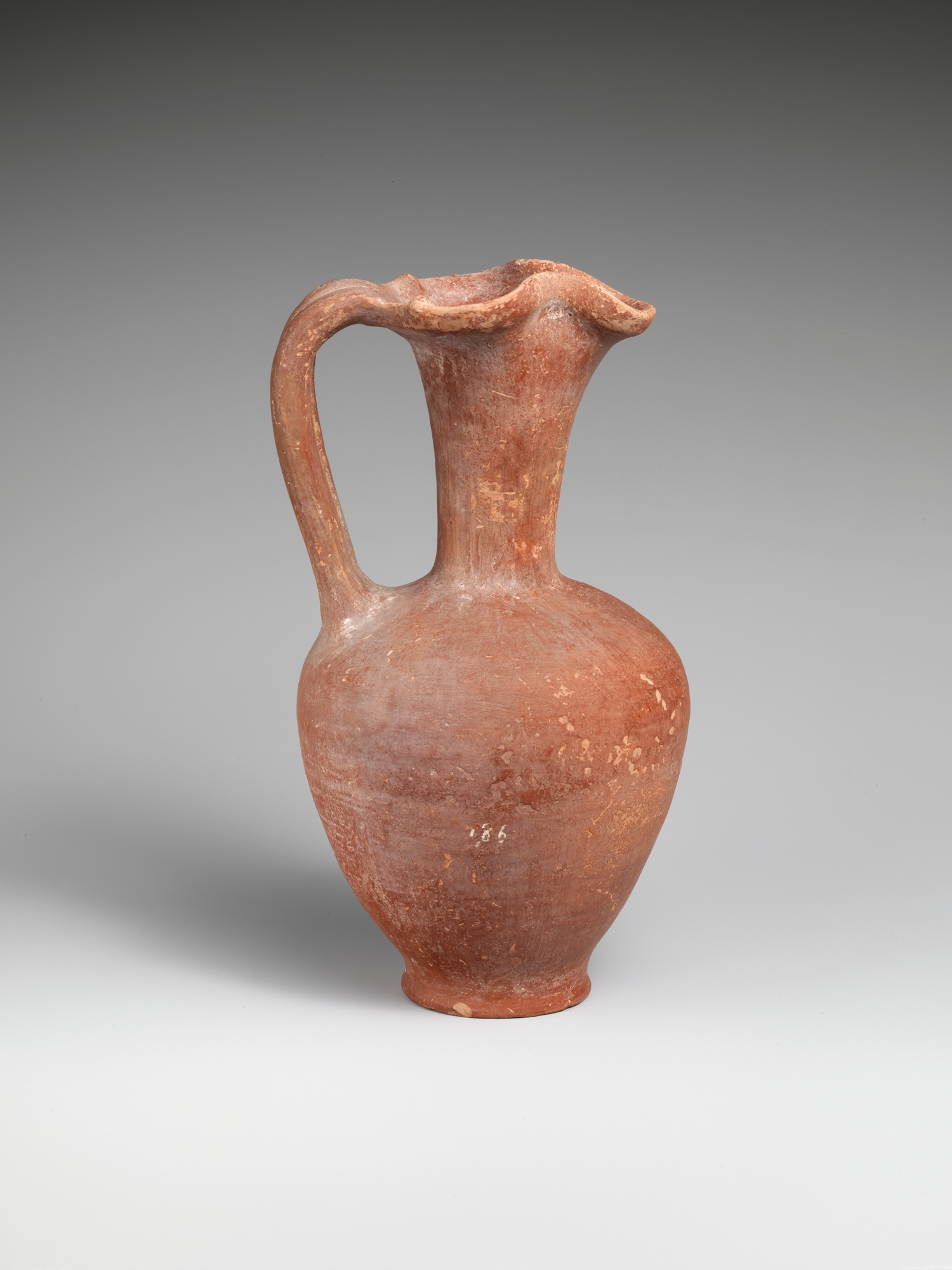
Oinochoe; 800–700 BC; terracotta; height: 24.1 cm; Metropolitan Museum of Art (New York City, US)

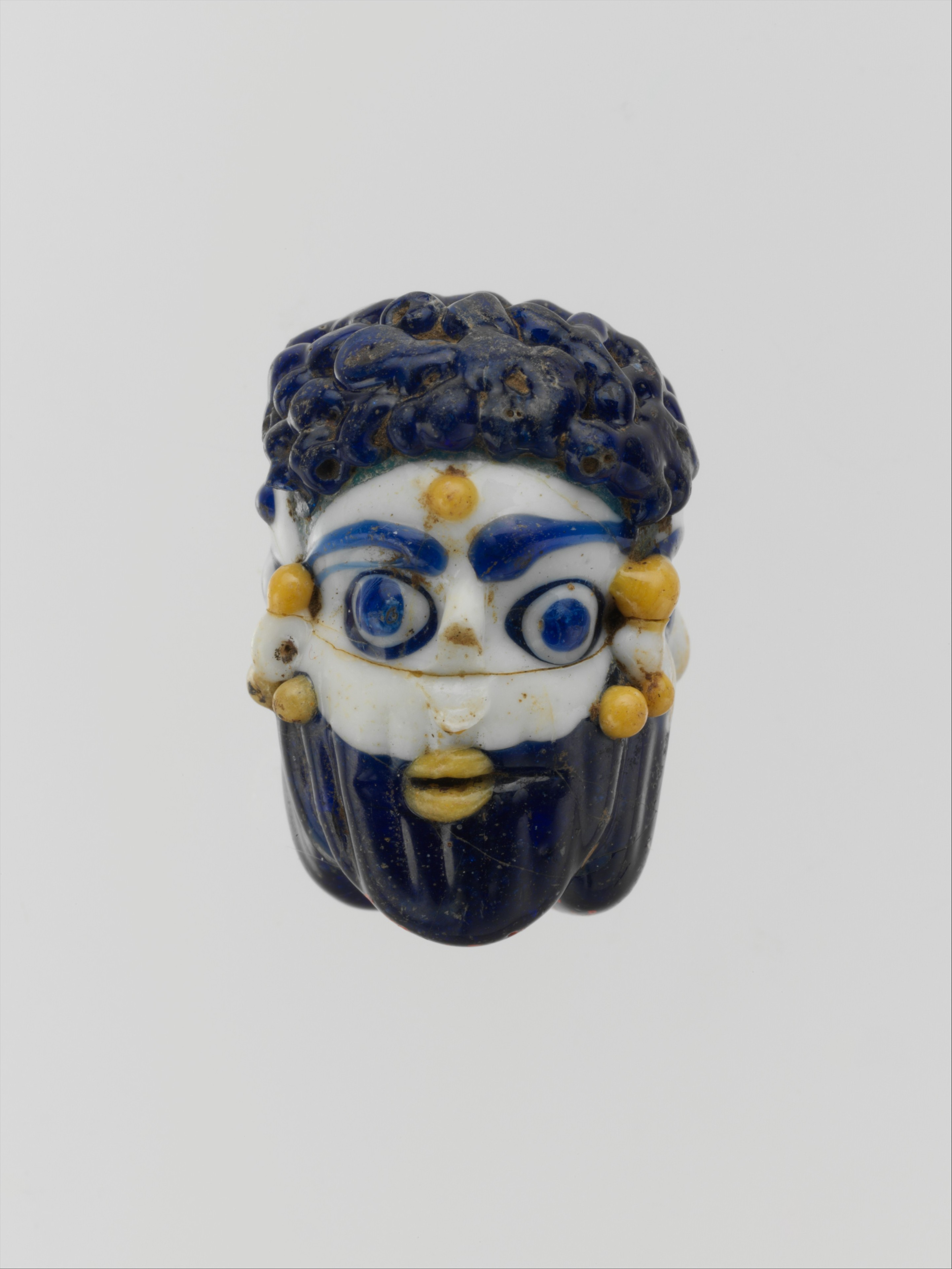
Face bead; mid-4th–3rd century BC; glass; height: 2.7 cm; Metropolitan Museum of Art

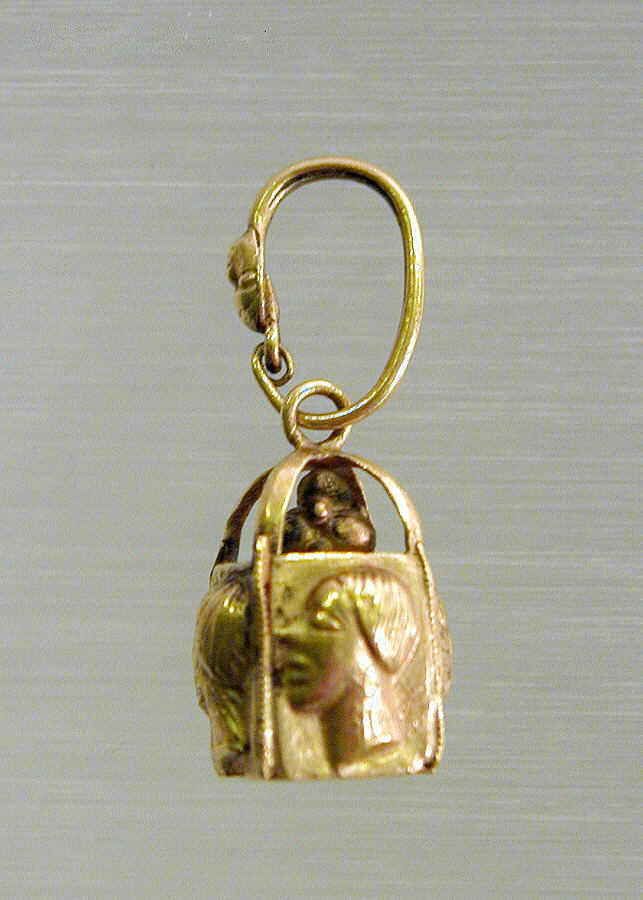
Earring from a pair, each with four relief faces; late fourth–3rd century BC; gold; overall: 3.5 x 0.6 cm; Metropolitan Museum of Art

=== Women ===
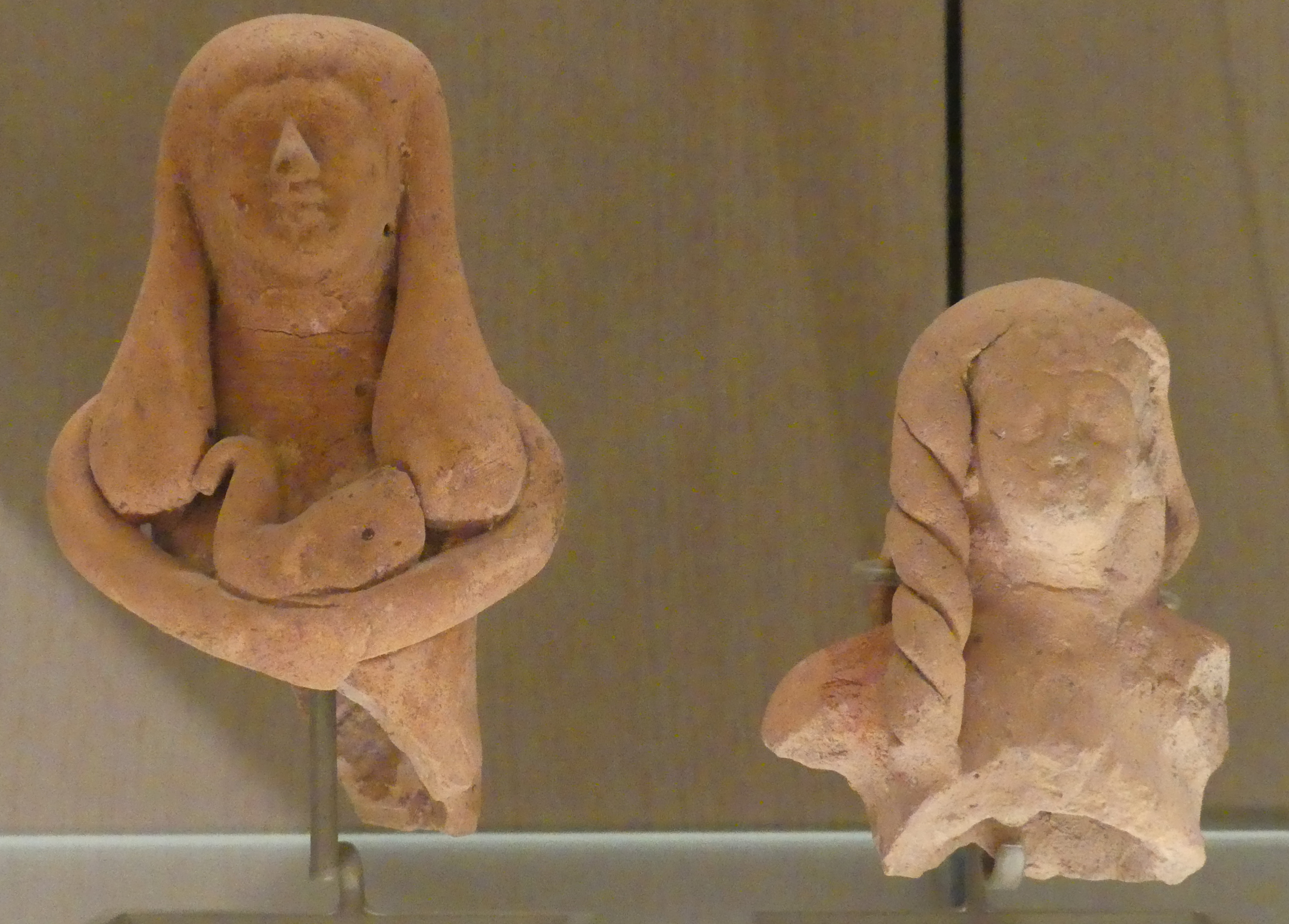
Female figurines from Tyre (c. 1000–550 BC). National Museum of Beirut.

Women in Phoenicia took part in public events and religious processions, with depictions of banquets showing them casually sitting or reclining with men, dancing, and playing music. In most contexts, women were expected to dress and behave more modestly than men; female figures are almost always portrayed as clothed from head to feet, with the arms sometimes covered as well.

Although they rarely had political power, women took part in community affairs, including in the popular assemblies that emerged in some city-states. At least one woman, Amoashtart, or Ummiashtart, is recorded to have ruled Sidon in the sixth century BC. The two most famous Phoenician women are political figures: Jezebel, portrayed in the Bible as the wicked princess of Sidon, and Dido, the semi-legendary founder and first queen of Carthage. In Virgil's epic poem, the Aeneid, Dido is described as having been the co-ruler of Tyre, using cleverness to escape the tyranny of her brother Pygmalion and to secure an ideal site for Carthage.

== Religion ==
Figure of Ba'al with raised arm, 14th–12th century BC, found at ancient Ugarit (Ras Shamra site), a city at the far north of the Phoenician coast. Musée du Louvre.

The religious practices and beliefs of Phoenicians were generally common to those of their neighbors in Canaan, which in turn shared characteristics common throughout the ancient Semitic world. Religious rites were primarily for city-state purposes; payment of taxes by citizens was considered in the category of religious sacrifices. The Phoenician sacred writings known to the ancients have been lost.

Several Canaanite practices are alleged in ancient sources and mentioned by scholars, such as temple prostitution and child sacrifice. Special sites known as "Tophets" were allegedly used by the Phoenicians "to burn their sons and their daughters in the fire", and are condemned in the Hebrew Bible, particularly in Jeremiah 7:30–32, and in 2nd Kings 23:10 and 17:17. Notwithstanding differences, cultural and religious similarities persisted between the ancient Hebrews and the Phoenicians. Biblical traditions state that the Tribe of Asher lived amongst local Phoenicians, and that David and Solomon gave Phoenicia full political autonomy due to their supremacy in shipping and trade.

Canaanite religious mythology does not appear as elaborate as their Semitic cousins in Mesopotamia. In Canaan the supreme god was called El (𐤀𐤋, 'god'). The son of El was Baal (𐤁𐤏𐤋, 'master', 'lord'), a powerful dying-and-rising thunder god. Other gods were called by royal titles, such as Melqart, meaning 'king of the city', or Adonis for 'lord'. Such epithets may often have been merely local titles for the same deities.

The Semitic pantheon was well-populated; which god became primary evidently depended on the exigencies of a particular city-state. Melqart was prominent throughout Phoenicia and overseas, as was Astarte, a fertility goddess with regal and matronly aspects.

Religious institutions in Tyre called marzeh (𐤌𐤓𐤆𐤄, 'place of reunion'), did much to foster social bonding and "kin" loyalty. Marzeh held banquets for their membership on festival days, and many developed into elite fraternities. Each marzeh nurtured congeniality and community through a series of ritual meals shared among trusted kin in honor of deified ancestors. In Carthage, which had developed a complex republican system of government, the marzeh may have played a role in forging social and political ties among citizens; Carthaginians were divided into different institutions that were solidified through communal feasts and banquets. Such festival groups may also have composed the voting cohort for selecting members of the city-state's Assembly.

The Phoenicians made votive offerings to their gods, namely in the form of figurines and pottery vessels. Figurines and votive fragments have been found in ceremonial favissae, underground storage spaces for sacred objects, in the temples grounds of the Temple of the Obelisks in Byblos, the Phoenician sanctuary of Kharayeb in the hinterland of Tyre, and the Temple of Eshmun north of Sidon, among others. Votive gifts were also recovered all over the Mediterranean, often spanning centuries between them, suggesting they were cast into the sea to ensure safe travels. Since the Phoenicians were predominantly a seafaring people, some sources have speculated that many of their rituals were performed at sea or aboard ships. However, the specific nature of these practices is unknown. On land they were renowned temple builders, perhaps inspiring elements of the architecture of the First Temple, the Temple of Solomon. According to William G. Dever, an archaeologist and scholar of the Old Testament, features of the Solomonic Temple such as its longitudinal tripartite plan, fine furnishings, and elaborate decorative motifs were inspired by Phoenician examples.

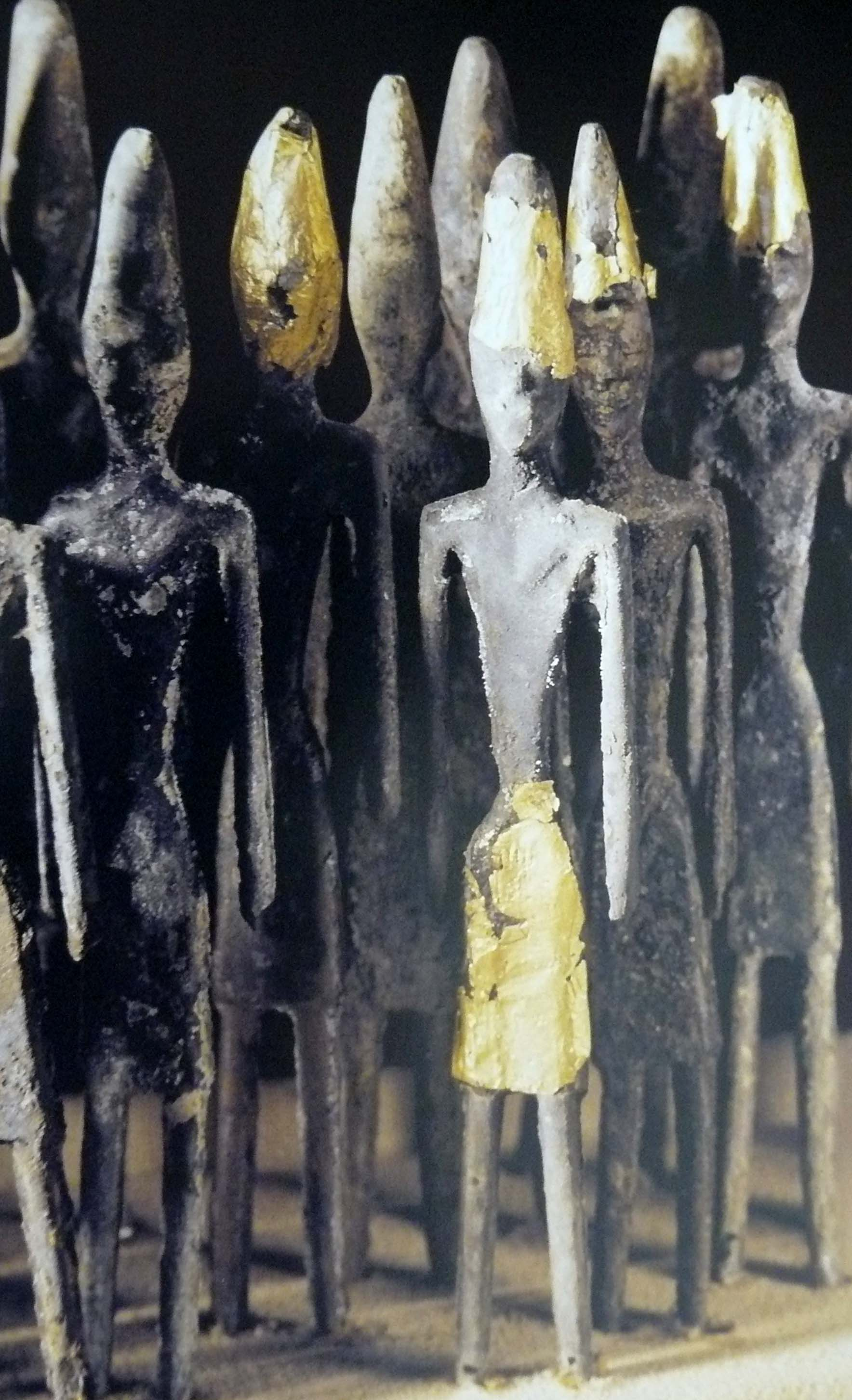
Votive deposit from the Temple of the Obelisks, a Bronze Age temple in the World Heritage Site of Byblos

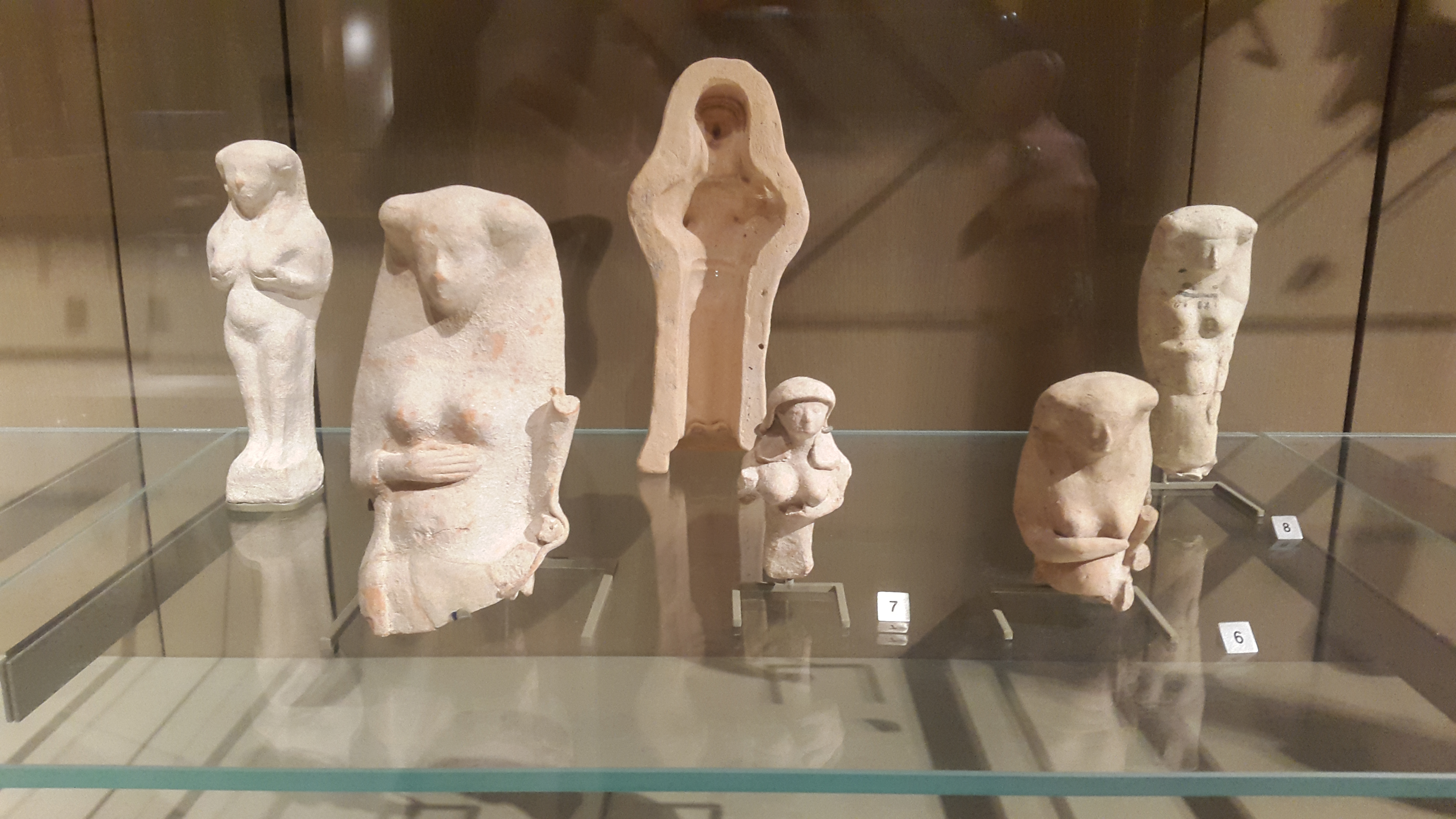
Iron Age terracotta figurines from the Phoenician sanctuary of Kharayeb

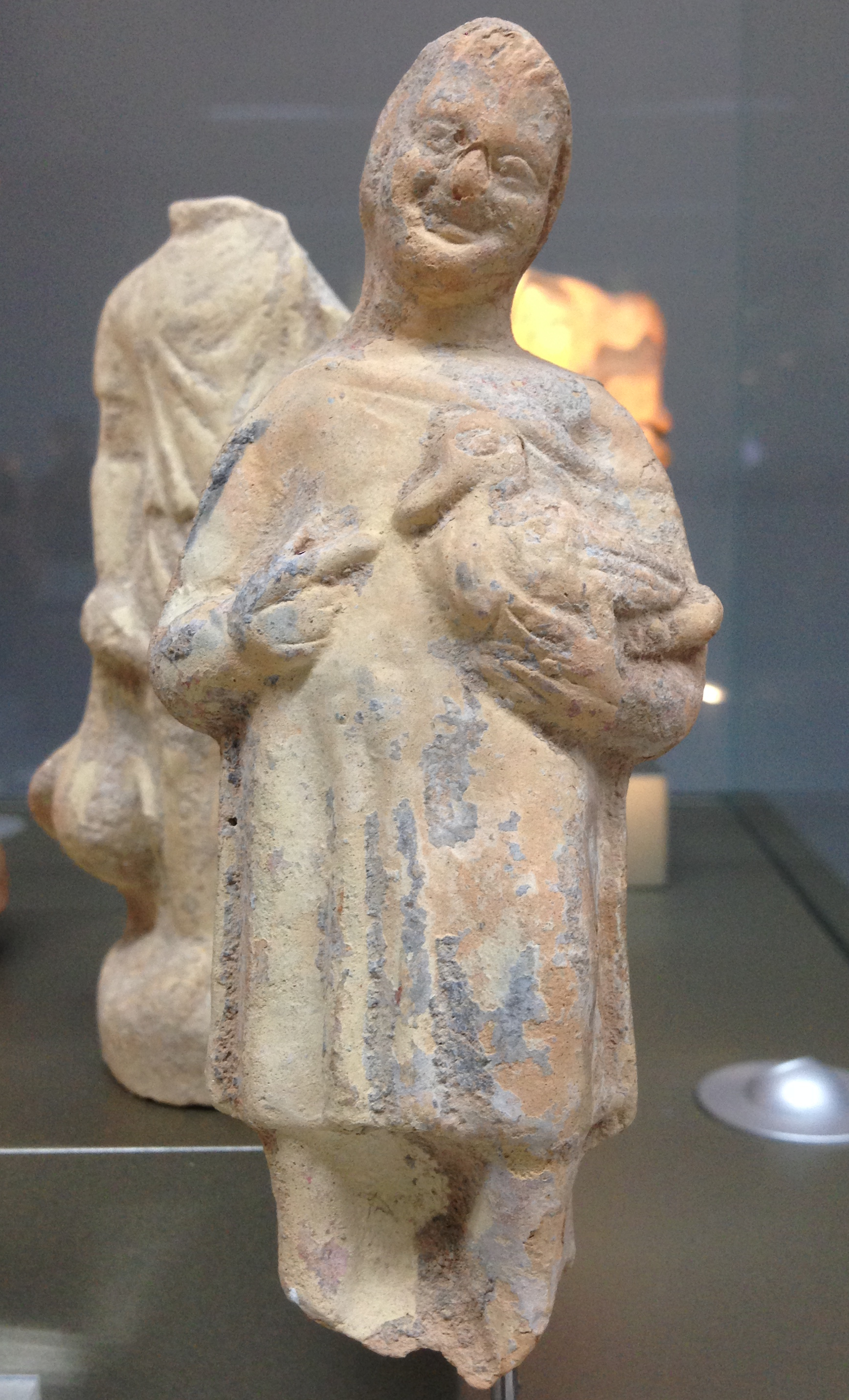
Fourth century BC votive figurine from the Phoenician sanctuary of Kharayeb

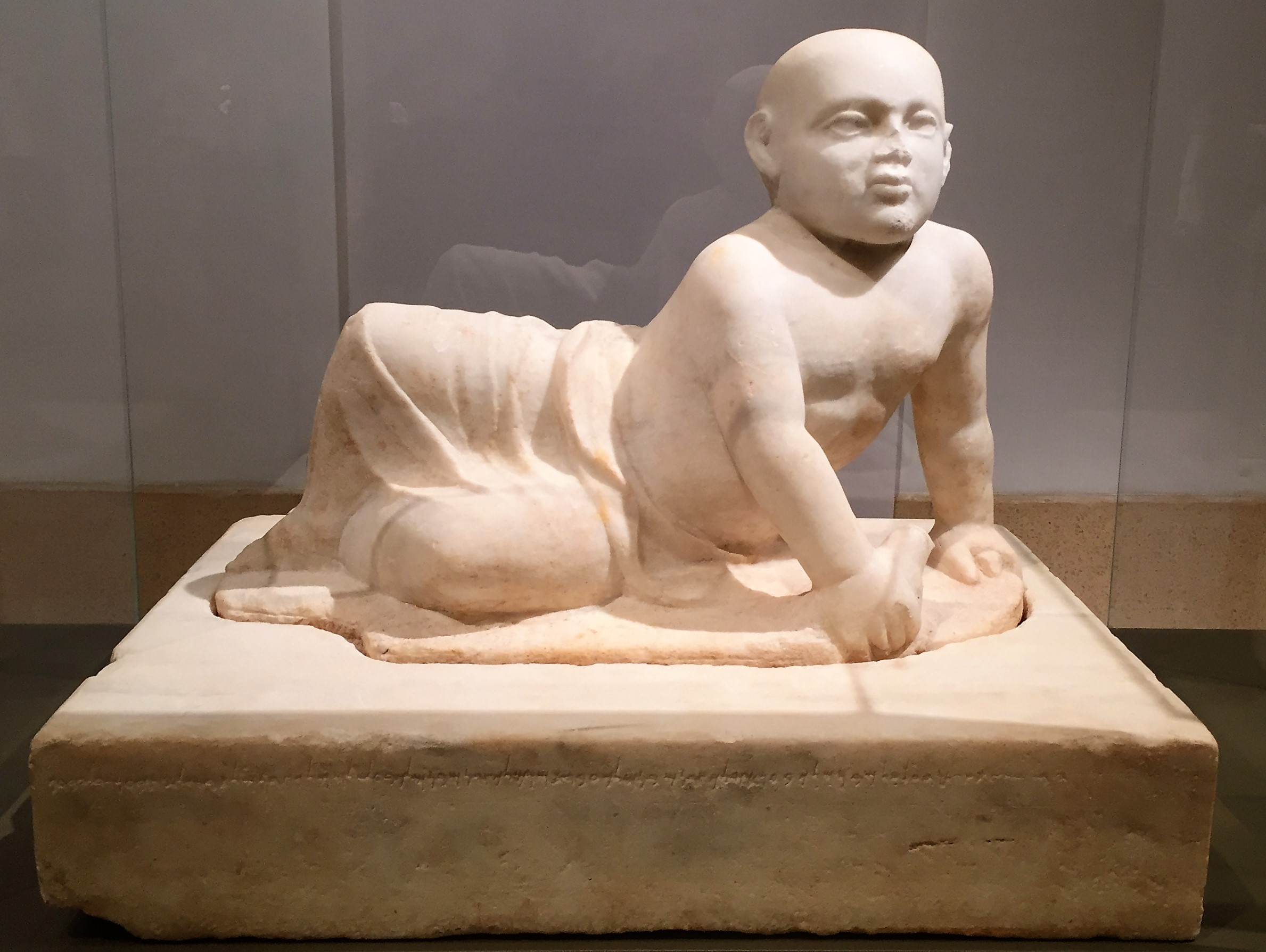
The Baalshillem Temple Boy, a 5th century BC royal votive gift from the Temple of Eshmun

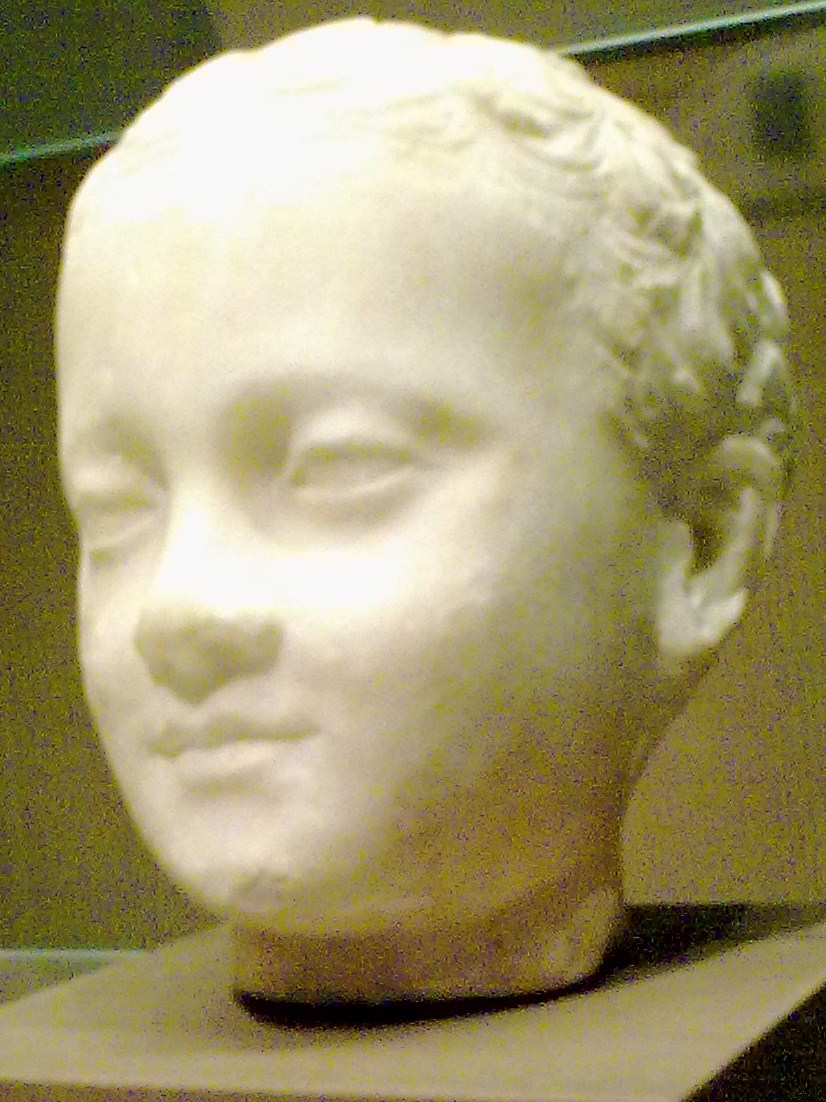
A head of a child, fifth century BC, from the Temple of Eshmun

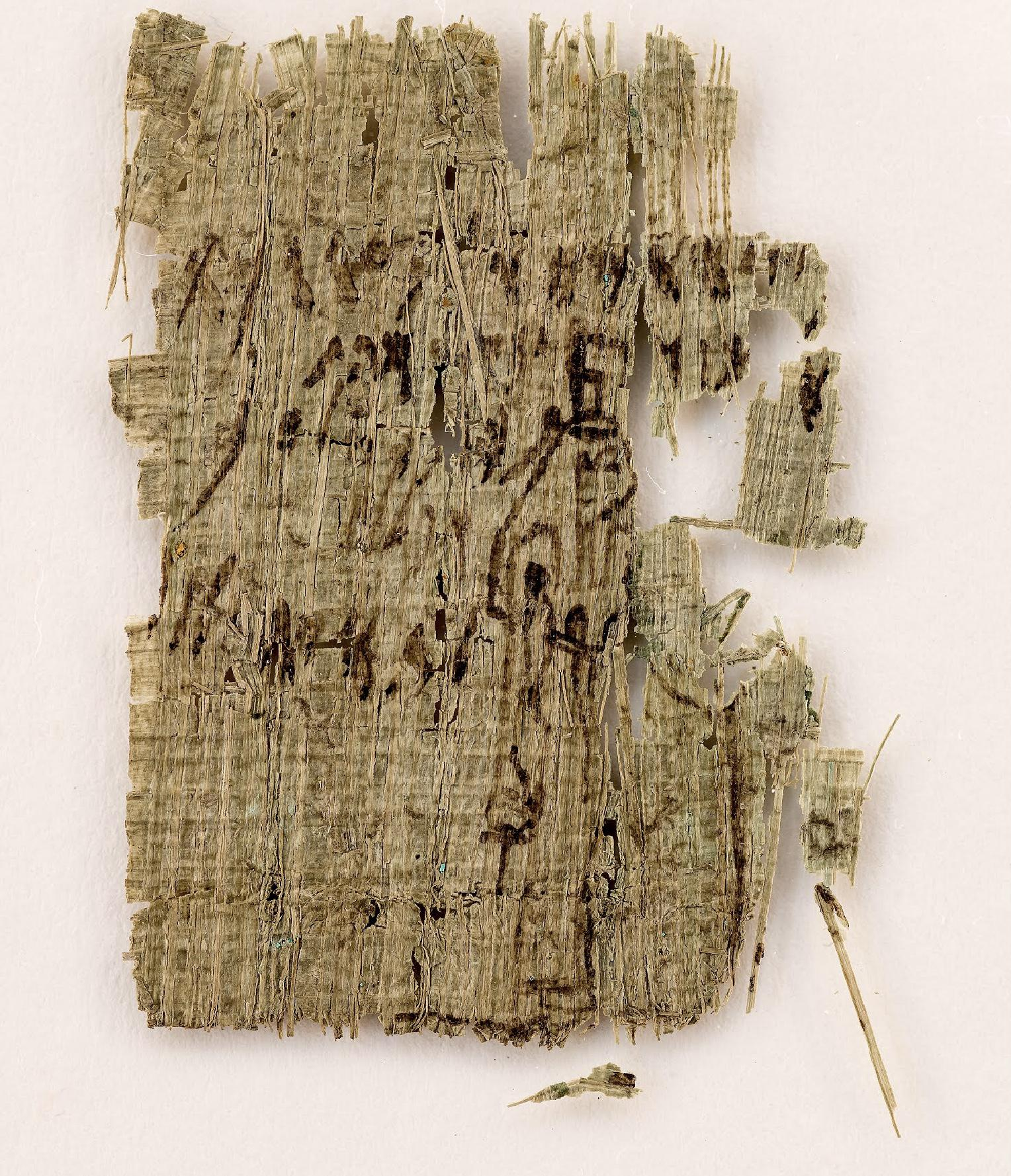
Phoenician prayer to Isis on papyrus with illustration, from Rabat, Malta.

== See also ==
- Maronites
- Names of the Levant
- Phoenicianism
- Punic people
- Theory of Phoenician discovery of the Americas
