= Dakerman archaeological site =

Chalcolithic archaeological site in Lebanon

Dakerman Archaeological Site
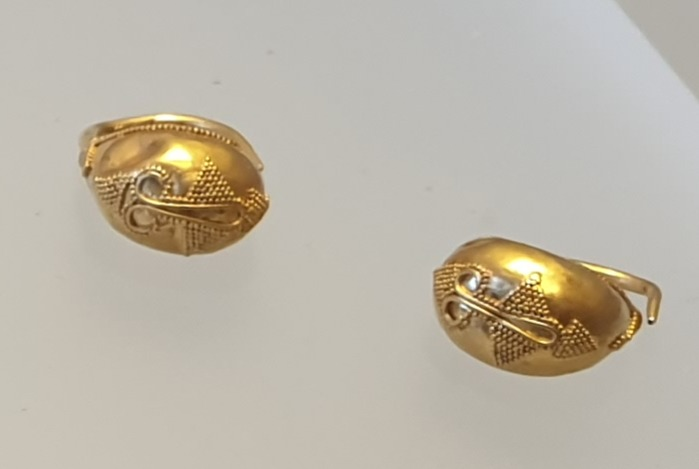
- Gold earrings in the shape of a leech. from Sidon, necropolis of Dakerman, gold, iron age III (600-400 BC)
- Interactive map of Dakerman Archaeological Site
- 33.551018°N 35.367016°E
- Periods: Chalcolithic (c. 4500–3000 BC), Early Bronze Age I
- Location: Sidon, Lebanon

Site notes
- Excavation dates: Roger Saidah (1967–1972)

The Dakerman (also Sidon-Dakerman) archaeological site is located south of Sidon, Lebanon. It comprises a Chalcolithic settlement excavated by Roger Saidah between 1967 and 1972, and a necropolis, also excavated by Saidah, whose tombs contained Mycenaean and Cypriot pottery.

== Excavation history ==
Roger Saidah excavated at Sidon-Dakerman between 1967 and 1972. Dakerman is one of several sites that add to knowledge of the Chalcolithic on the Lebanese coast, alongside Byblos, Khalde II and Minet ed-Dalieh; Byblos offering the most extensive evidence from the period.

Saidah excavated a number of tombs between 1967 and 1973 in the necropolis known as the necropolis of Dakerman, immediately adjacent to Sidon's south harbour (also called the Egyptian harbour). Saidah presented his doctoral dissertation on the results of these excavations at the Sorbonne in 1977, and it was published in 2004 by the Institut Français du Proche-Orient.

== Description ==
The Lebanese archaeologist Gassia Artin places Dakerman among the sites of the Chalcolithic of the fourth millennium BC. She notes that Byblos and Sidon-Dakerman underwent a similar growth, illustrated by habitation structures and jar burials. Unlike Byblos, which was occupied continuously from the Neolithic until the medieval period, she notes that Dakerman was abandoned by its inhabitants after the fourth millennium BC. Saidah's excavations uncovered 23 well-preserved, single-room, ellipsoidal stone-built houses, of various sizes, averaging 8 m × 4 m (26 ft × 13 ft). Several houses had burnt, and their fire-hardened plastered floors preserved the imprints of reeds.

Artin writes that no defensive installations were discovered; however, according to Saidah, the excavation of the southern side of Dakerman revealed a fortification wall extending about 60 m (200 ft). It is not known whether the village was entirely surrounded by such a wall, nor whether it was a real fortification or only an enclosure.

Carayon et al. describe Dakerman as the earliest evidence for human occupation in their study of Sidon's coast, a small Chalcolithic settlement found near the crique ronde, the semicircular bay south of the Sidon promontory. They write that excavations at Sidon's College site show the habitat relocating from Dakerman to the promontory at the beginning of the 3rd millennium BC. They suggest that the crique ronde may have served Chalcolithic fishermen at Dakerman or Sidon as a fair-weather harbour for small vessels.

== Funerary practices ==
Artin states that the tradition of jar burials, already in use in the Neolithic, continued during the fourth millennium BC at coastal sites of the northern Levant. At these sites, immature individuals were generally placed under pieces of large ceramic vessels, or in large bowls or small jars, associated with habitations. At Dakerman, however, only adult jar burials were found in the Dakerman site Chalcolithic layers. Compared with Byblos, most jar burials at other sites contain few grave goods or beads. A flint flake found on the pelvis of a skeleton in Tomb 4 at Dakerman is an exception.

The Cypriot archaeologist Vassos Karageorghis describes the number of Mycenaean IIIA–B vases and the quantity of Late Cypriote I–II pottery found in the Dakerman tombs as representing a standard repertoire of forms. The Mycenaean forms are mainly drinking cups, stirrup jars and a few other closed vessels, and also include a Mycenaean IIIA:2 kylix, a Mycenaean IIIB bowl decorated with bird motifs and a Ψ-type anthropomorphic terracotta figurine. The Cypriot pottery consists mainly of Base-ring I–II jugs and bowls and White Slip I–II bowls, together with Red Lustrous Wheelmade bottles and juglets of White Shaved ware.

== See also ==
- Sidon
- Chalcolithic Levant
- Archaeology of Lebanon
