= Black Swan Project =

2007 recovery of coins from a Spanish wreck

The Black Swan Project is the project name given by Odyssey Marine Exploration for its discovery and recovery of an estimated US$500 million (£314 million) worth of silver and gold coins from the ocean floor. Initially Odyssey kept the origin of the treasure confidential. It was later proved in trial that the recovered cargo was being carried by the Spanish frigate Nuestra Señora de las Mercedes, which was sunk by the British Royal Navy off Portugal in 1804.

Knowledge of the recovery became public on May 18, 2007, when the company flew 17 tons of coins, mostly silver, from Gibraltar to a secure location of unknown address in Florida, United States. The company did not release the type, date, or nationality of the coins, while a rumor attributed it to the Merchant Royal, which sank near Land's End in 1641. At the time, Odyssey said that it planned to return to the site to perform an excavation expected to uncover more coins as well as other artifacts. However, Odyssey was sued by the Spanish government in U.S. courts, which eventually ordered the treasure to be returned to Spain. Odyssey pursued all legal avenues, even taking the case to the U.S. Supreme Court and losing. On February 27, 2012, the ship's treasure was flown back to Spain where the coins and other artifacts from the shipwreck are now in the National Museum of Subaquatic Archaeology in Cartagena (Murcia). In 2015 a U.S. district court ordered Odyssey to pay Spain $1 million for "bad faith and abusive litigation."

== Ship identity ==
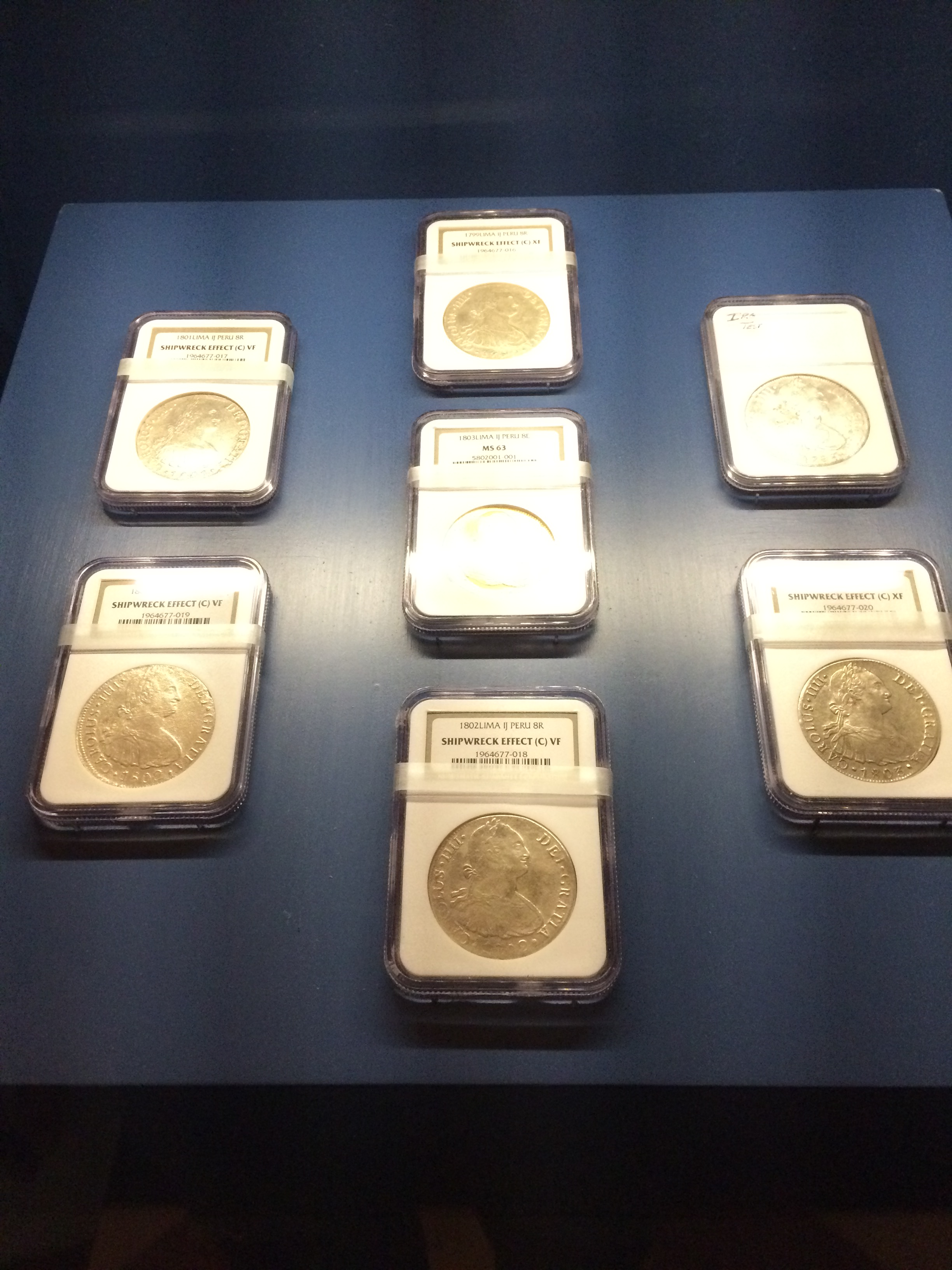
Coins from the reign of Charles IV of Spain salvaged by Odyssey from the "Black Swan" site and ready for sale.

Odyssey Marine stated on 21 May 2007 that most of the recovered coins and treasure are believed to be from a particular shipwreck, but it was likely that artifacts from other wrecks had also been mixed in and were recovered. Odyssey said that due to the location of the ship in an area known to contain a large number of colonial-era wrecks, the identity of the ship would not be disclosed pending further examination of the coins and artifacts. It was also thought the treasure might be from a ship that Odyssey had petitioned a federal court for permission to salvage, which was located off the southwest coast of the United Kingdom, within a five-mile (8 km) radius of 49°25′N 6°0′W.

Mike Johnson initially speculated that the treasure might be from the wreck of the English merchant ship Merchant Royal, which sank on 23 September 1641 whilst returning to London. That ship sank in heavy weather when its pumps failed to keep up with the water leaking through the hull planks. Over half the crew, including the captain, John Limbrey, were able to abandon ship and were rescued by a sister-ship, Dover Merchant, which was accompanying Merchant Royal from Cadiz to London. The survivors provided a detailed description of the lost cargo—described in 1641 as "300,000 Pounds in silver, 100,000 Pounds in gold, and as much again in jewel"—as well as a general location near the Isles of Scilly, about "21 leagues" (about 35 to 40 miles) from Lands End.

In 2005, the co-founder of Odyssey Marine, Greg Stemm, had admitted to British shipwreck expert Richard Larn that his firm was searching for Merchant Royal. Odyssey Marine's sonar search ships trawled the area extensively in 2005 and 2006, frequently calling in Falmouth for crew rest. The Odyssey crew continued to allegedly search for the ship on the Discovery Channel 2009 television show Treasure Quest (filmed in 2008). Pictures of the coins released by Odyssey have had their markings obscured to prevent identification. However, from examining the edges of the coins it appears that they come from the middle of the 18th century, too late to be from Merchant Royal.

Rare coin expert Nick Bruyer, who examined a sample of 6,000 coins from the wreck, said of the discovery, "For this colonial era, I think (the find) is unprecedented... I don't know of anything equal or comparable to it." He also believes much or all of the coinage is uncirculated. The finds were shipped in a chartered jet to an undisclosed location in the United States to be examined. Odyssey said they expected the wreck to become one of the "most publicised in history". The entire operation is thought to have taken years and cost millions.

== Recovery ==
Graphic novelist Paco Roca, who with Spanish diplomat Guillermo Corral wrote a fictionalised version of the project, says that they were "critical of the company's manner of extracting the treasure, using a kind of giant vacuum cleaner and destroying the wreck site, which is also a marine cemetery".

== Filing of claims ==
In order to establish a legal claim to the recovered cargo, Odyssey filed in U.S. court for an arrest of the cargo on April 4, 2007, and then published notice of that arrest on May 7, 2007. On May 31, 2007, the Spanish government, pursuant to the notice of the arrest, filed a claim against the recovered cargo based on the claim that the silver and gold coins recovered by Odyssey Marine came from a Spanish vessel, the Nuestra Señora de las Mercedes, a 36-gun Spanish frigate that went down off the Portuguese coast en route from Montevideo to Cádiz. The Mercedes, which was sunk by British Navy ships in October 1804, was known to be carrying more than a million silver dollars.

In January 2008, a US Federal Court in Tampa ordered Odyssey Marine to disclose details of the wreck site to the Spanish government and for both to return to court in March. During those proceedings, Odyssey Marine stated that its Black Swan treasure was recovered in the Atlantic approximately 180 miles (290 km) west of Portugal. That location would appear to rule out the Merchant Royal (which sank much further north in the Atlantic), and the Mercedes (which sank approximately 30 nautical miles (56 km) off the Portuguese coast), and HMS Sussex (which sank inside the Strait of Gibraltar.) The recovered bullion, being predominately silver coins, with some gold coins and copper ingots, strongly suggests it came from a colonial-era Spanish ship that sank while transporting newly minted silver from South America to Spain.

Salvage law in international waters, as recognized by some English-speaking countries, could award 90% of recovered treasure to the salvage firm. Spain claimed the entire ownership of the wreck and cargo, saying that it would pay no salvage award at all for the recovery because the cargo of the Mercedes would be protected by sovereign immunity, which supersedes admiralty law. Because some of the recovered coins were minted in Lima, the Peruvian government also laid claim to the treasure. In 2008, Jose Jimenez, a senior official with the Spanish Ministry of Culture stated that Spain would be willing to share the treasure 'out of a sense of a common cultural heritage'. However, Peru, as well as the descendants of the merchants who shipped the coins as cargo aboard the Mercedes, are contesting Spain's right to the treasure, along with Odyssey, in a pending court case.

== Dispute ==
Spanish authorities decided to return passports and official documents to some members of the crew and allow some to leave. The survey vessel was cleared for departure by the Spanish Civil Guard on July 14, 2007.

The Spanish government stated that it considers it acted within its own territorial waters. The UK argued that the incident took place in international waters and was therefore illegal. However, Spain verbally stated its claim over the waters that it does not recognise Gibraltar waters except within the port of Gibraltar and that all waters up to 12 miles (19 km) from the coastline it claims, are considered Spanish waters.

On July 26, 2007, Odyssey Marine Exploration was granted two of the three motions for an Extension of Time to file its responses to the Spain's Motions for More Definite Statements in the three admiralty arrests which Odyssey had pending at the U.S. District Court that assumed jurisdiction over the sites.

On October 16, 2007, Spain seized another vessel, Odyssey Explorer owned by Odyssey Marine Exploration as it sailed out of port from the British overseas territory of Gibraltar. The Odyssey Explorer captain, Sterling Vorus, claimed to have been in international waters, but was forced to dock at Algeciras under what Vorus declared was "threat of deadly force." Once in port, Vorus was eventually arrested for disobedience after refusing inspection of the vessel without first receiving approval of Odyssey Explorer's flag state, the Commonwealth of the Bahamas. Vorus was released the following day. Aboard the Odyssey Explorer at the time of seizure, were about a dozen journalists and photographers, all of whom had their videotapes, tape recorders, and computer memory storage devices seized by Spanish officials.

On June 4, 2009, a U.S. magistrate judge in Tampa, Florida (United States District Court for the Middle District of Florida) determined from written submissions that the treasure had come from the Spanish warship, Nuestra Señora de las Mercedes. Declaring that he lacked jurisdiction to proceed with the case, he ruled in favor of Spain's claim of sovereign immunity. Odyssey Marine stated it planned to appeal the ruling.

On December 22, 2009, a U.S. district judge validated the magistrate's report and recommendations but stayed the order to turn over the treasure to Spain until the Appeals process was completed. "The ineffable truth of this case is that the Mercedes is a naval vessel of Spain and that the wreck of this naval vessel, the vessel's cargo, and any human remains are the natural and legal patrimony of Spain," said the judge in his order.

In January 2011, Odyssey Marine claimed that the language used in recently leaked diplomatic cables showed that the US State Department had been involved with negotiations to assist the Spanish government in receiving the treasure in exchange for the return of allegedly stolen artwork to a US private citizen. The US State Department declined to comment while Spain denied Odyssey Marine's claim. The Department of State's Office of Inspector General subsequently investigated the charges in response to a request by Representative Kathy Castor of Florida. In March 2011, it determined that it could find no evidence of a connection between the Black Swan case and the negotiations for the return of the artwork in question (a Pissarro painting).

In September 2011, The 11th Circuit Court of Appeals agreed with the lower court's determination that the unidentified ship was in fact the Nuestra Señora de las Mercedes and ruled that Odyssey Marine must return the 17 tons of silver coins and other recovered treasures to the Spanish government. The text of the decision can be found by searching the Appeals Court's opinions database for case no. 10–10269. The Court's decision rested mainly on its interpretation of the Foreign Sovereign Immunities Act (FSIA) and on the principle of comity. It said, "We do not hold the recovered [treasure] is ultimately Spanish property. Rather, we merely hold the sovereign immunity owed the shipwreck of the Mercedes also applies to any cargo the Mercedes was carrying when it sank."

January 31, 2012, the 11th U.S. Circuit Court of Appeals in Atlanta, Georgia, rejected a motion from Odyssey Marine to stay the same court's November decision ordering the company to turn over the hoard.

On February 9, 2012, the U.S. Supreme Court declined to hear an emergency application for a stay filed by Odyssey Marine, which said it wanted to maintain possession of a half-billion dollars' worth of gold and silver coins until a final decision is made about who owns them. Justice Clarence Thomas, who has jurisdiction over applications from Florida, denied without comment the motion in Odyssey Marine Exploration Inc. v. Kingdom of Spain. Odyssey Marine had made an emergency appeal to the high court in an attempt to block a lower court's order last week that it turn over the treasure to Spain.

== Conclusion ==
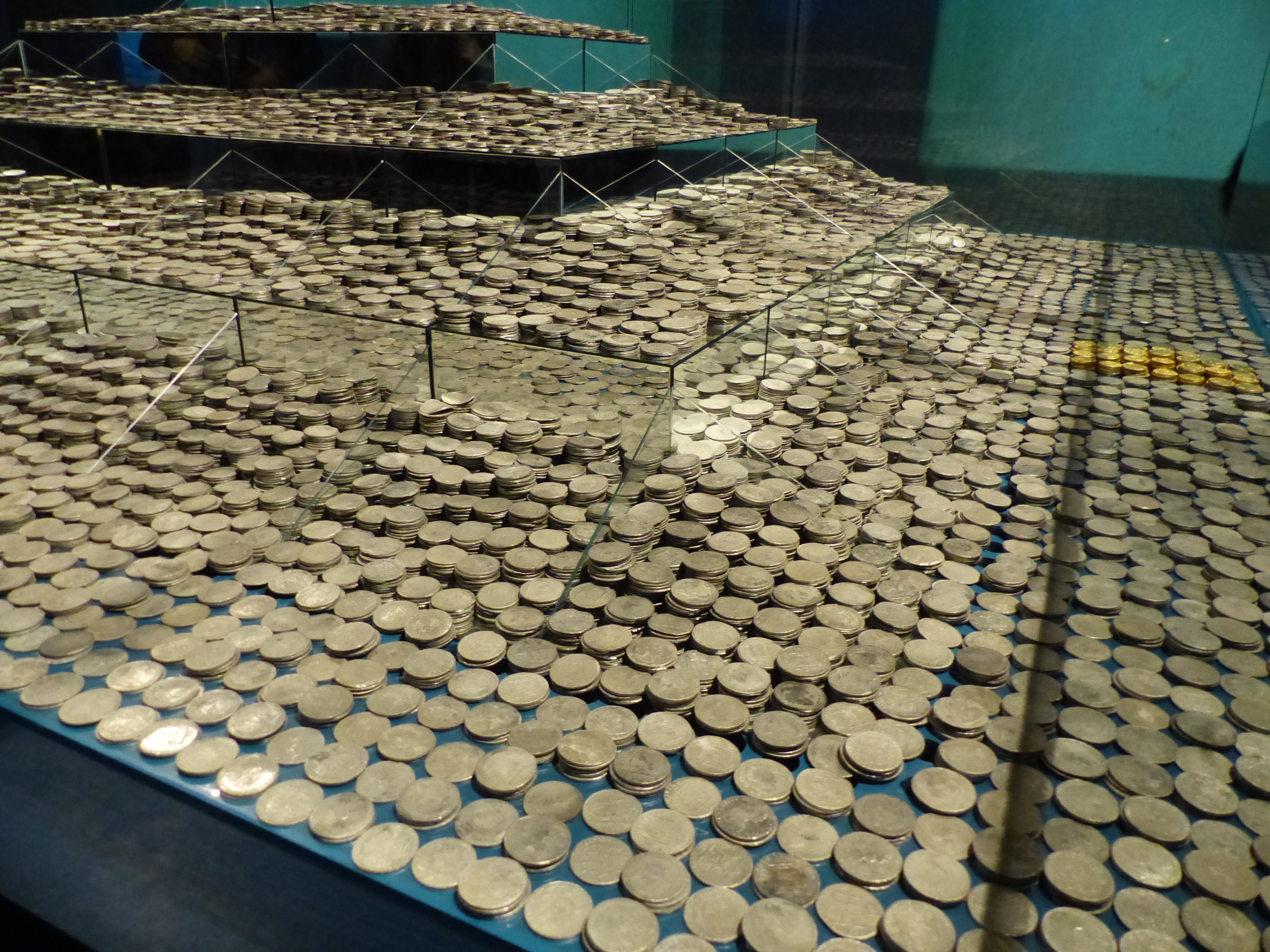
Sample of coins from the Mercedes treasure displayed at a Spanish museum in 2015.

On February 17, 2012, it was reported that U.S. Magistrate Judge Mark Pizzo ordered Odyssey to return the coins to Spain by February 24, 2012, where they will be dispersed to museums, not to heirs. The Supreme Court declined to stay this order and Odyssey will abide by the decision. On February 24, 2012, two C-130 Hercules aircraft from the Spanish Air Force picked up the treasure in Florida and transported it to Spain. Odyssey petitioned the Supreme Court to reconsider the issues in the case but on May 14, 2012, the court declined to take up the appeal. The coins have been returned to Spain, whereby Spanish law dictates that they can never be sold to the public.

On December 2, 2012, the Spanish Government deposited the 14.5 tons of gold and silver coins recovered in the National Museum of Subaquatic Archaeology in Cartagena (Murcia) for cataloging, study and permanent display.

In 2015 a U.S. district court ordered Odyssey to pay Spain $1 million for "bad faith and abusive litigation". The judge observed that, throughout the lawsuit, "Odyssey knew at all times that Spain, given the information pertinent to identification, possessed the historical information and the expertise to identify immediately whether the wreck in question was a Spanish vessel" and that "the fact that Odyssey never asked for Spain's assistance in identifying the vessel reveals much about Odyssey's motives and objectives."

Since 2014, part of the treasure has been on display in several Spanish public museums as part of an extensive itinerant exhibit relating to the sinking of the ship, and the recovery of the treasure.

On August 30, 2017, as a follow-up to the project, the Spanish Navy rescued two cannons, named "Santa Barbara" and "Santa Rufina", each weighing more than 2 tons. They had been cast in bronze and signed by smelter Bernardino de Tejeda, born in Seville, Spain, and who died in Lima, Peru, the direct ancestor of Javier Pérez de Cuéllar (Lima, Peru, 1920-2020), the fifth Secretary-General of the United Nations.

== In popular culture ==
A fictionalised comic book based on the project, The Treasure of the Black Swan, written by a Spanish diplomat involved in the legal battle, Guillermo Corral, and Spanish graphic novelist Paco Roca was produced in 2018. It was adapted into the television series La Fortuna (2021). The same year, a Spanish action film directed by Jaume Balagueró called The Vault, that bears a passing resemblance to the Black Swan story, was released by Sony Pictures.

National Geographic's 2021 film, 'Battle for the Black Swan', written and directed by Christopher Riley, tells the story of the discovery of the wreck, the salvage, and subsequent dispute. It won a gold medal for History and Society at the 2022 New York Festivals TV & Film Awards.

== See also ==
- Admiralty law
- Foreign Sovereign Immunities Act
- Precedent
- Public policy doctrine
- Purposive theory
- Standard of review
- Sovereignty
- Supreme Court of the United States
- Treasure hunting (marine)
