= Royal Merchant =

17th-century English merchant ship

History

England
- Name: Royal Merchant
- Owner: Captain Limbrey
- Builder: Deptford Dockyard, London
- Launched: 1627
- Fate: Sank, 23 September 1641

General characteristics
- Type: Galleon
- Tons burthen: 700 tons bm
- Length: 157 ft (48 m)
- Sail plan: Full-rigged ship
- Crew: 57
- Armament: 32 × bronze cannon

The Royal Merchant was a 17th-century English merchant ship that was lost at sea off Land's End in rough weather on 23 September 1641. On board were at least 100,000 pounds of gold (over US$1.5 billion in today's money), 400 bars of Mexican silver (another 1 million) and nearly 500,000 pieces of eight and other coins, making it one of the most valuable wrecks of all time. It is dubbed the El Dorado of the seas.

The Royal Merchant spent two years trading with Spanish colonies in the West Indies from 1637 to 1640. England was at peace with Spain at this time. The Royal Merchant and her sister-ship, the Dover Merchant, called into Cádiz on their way home to London. By all accounts she was leaking badly after her long voyage.

When a Spanish ship in Cádiz at the same time caught fire just before she was due to carry treasure to convert into pay for Spain's 30,000 soldiers in Flanders, the Royal Merchant's Captain Limbrey saw his chance to make a little more cash for his owners. He volunteered to carry the treasure to Antwerp on his way home.

The Royal Merchant kept leaking after she and her sister-ship left Cádiz and, when the pumps broke down, she sank off Land's End in rough weather on 23 September 1641.

Eighteen men drowned in the sinking. Captain Limbrey and 40 of his crew got away in boats and were picked up by Dover Merchant. It is not likely that the treasure was taken aboard the Dover Merchant.

Sept. 30, Lond[on].

I suppose you have understood of the loss of the Royal Merchant coming into our road, which is the greatest that was ever sustained in one ship, being worth 400,000l. at least. The merchants of Antwerp will be the greatest losers, for she had in her belonging to them 300,000l. in bullion; if so be the Infante Cardinal lose not upon it Flanders for want of money to pay the soldiers.

– 'Charles I – volume 484: September 1641', Calendar of State Papers Domestic: Charles I, 1641–3 (1887), pp. 114–129

== Search for the wreck ==
The Odyssey Marine Exploration company has tried for several years to locate the wreck but has been unsuccessful thus far.

In 2007 the team announced the Black Swan Project, the name given by Odyssey Marine Exploration for its discovery and recovery of an estimated US$500 million (£363 million) worth of silver and gold coins, from a shipwreck, was originally rumored in the press to be from the Royal Merchant. The Odyssey team is still uncertain as to the identity of the wreck, but now believe it may be the Nuestra Señora de las Mercedes, a Spanish vessel sunk in 1804.

The team continued to search for the ship on the 2009 Discovery Channel television show, Treasure Quest, but were unsuccessful once again. These are not the only team to look for this ship. Isles of Scilly-based Treasure Hunter Todd Stevens also periodically looks for her remains. This is because the narratives show that the Royal Merchant sank 10 leagues from Land's End, which is 30 nautical miles or about 35 statute miles. A search area that large also encompasses the Isles of Scilly. In more recent times an anchor was trawled up by fishermen off Land's End and the media wrongly printed that the wreck had been found. However, Stevens believes that anchor to be Dutch and too late in date to be from the Royal Merchant.
