= HMS Victory (1737) =

Ship of the line of the Royal Navy

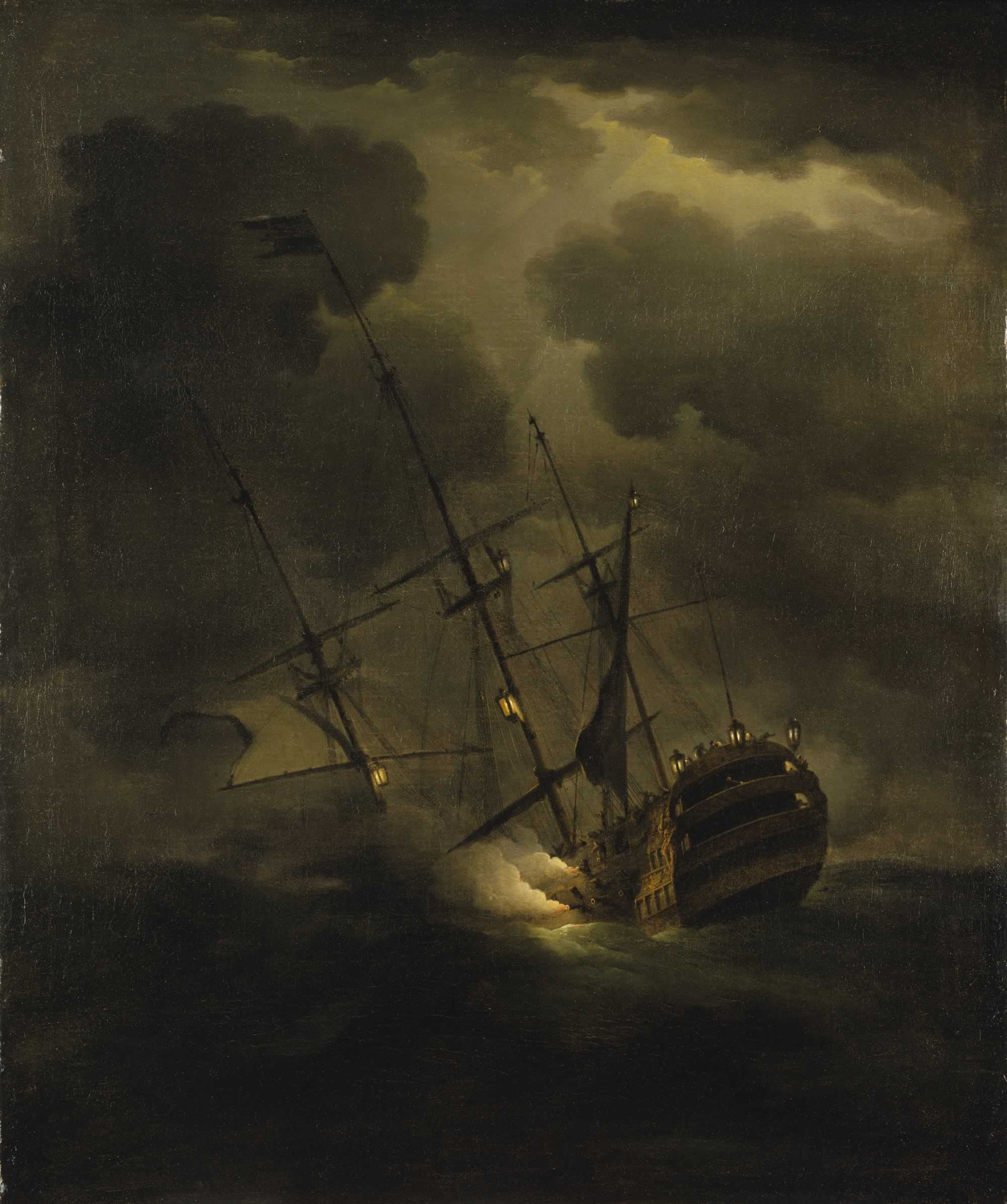
- Painting of Victory sinking on 4 October 1744

History

Great Britain
- Name: HMS Victory
- Ordered: 11 September 1733
- Builder: Portsmouth Dockyard
- Laid down: 1736
- Launched: 23 February 1737
- Fate: Wrecked, 4/5 October 1744

General characteristics
- Class & type: 1733 proposals 100-gun first rate ship of the line
- Tons burthen: 1921 bm
- Length: 174 ft (53 m) gundeck
- Beam: 50 ft (15 m)
- Draught: 18 ft (5.5 m)
- Depth of hold: 20 ft 6 in (6.25 m)
- Sail plan: Full-rigged ship
- Complement: Around 900
- Armament: 100 guns: Gundeck: 28 × 42-pdrs; Middle gundeck: 28 × 24-pdrs; Upper gundeck: 28 × 12-pdrs; Quarterdeck: 12 × 6-pdrs; Forecastle: 4 × 6-pdrs

HMS Victory was a 100-gun first-rate ship of the line of the Royal Navy, built to the dimensions of the 1733 proposals of the 1719 Establishment at Portsmouth Dockyard, and launched on 23 February 1737. She sank on the night of 4 October 1744 near the Channel Islands with the loss of her entire crew of 1,150. Her wreck was discovered in 2008.

== Construction ==
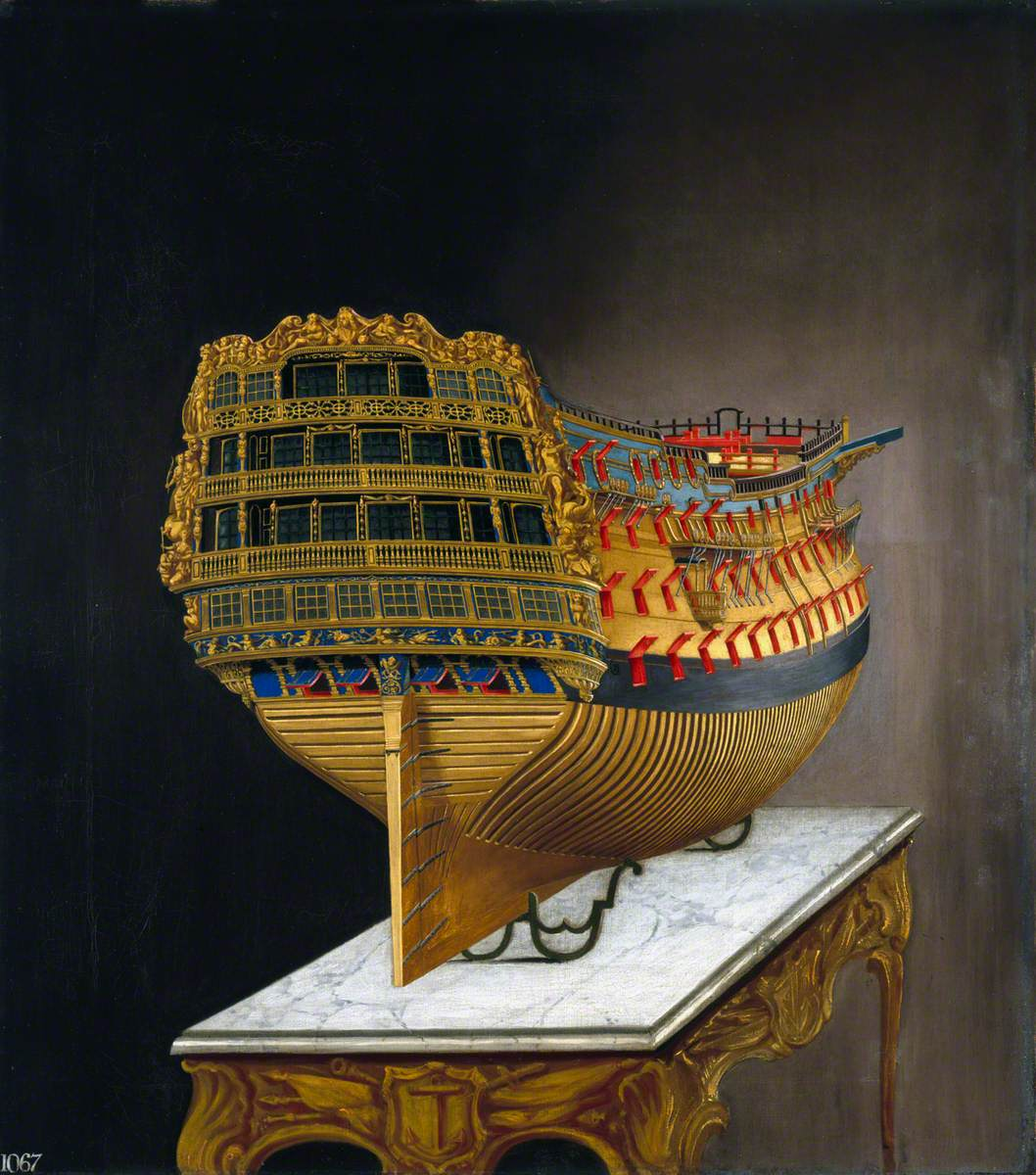
Model of the Victory, painted in 1744

A small number of the timbers used in the construction of Victory were taken from the remains of the previous HMS Victory, which caught fire and was burnt to the waterline in February 1721 whilst having weed burned from her bottom (in a process called "breaming"). Originally drawn by Jacob Ackworth the plans were sent to Master Shipwright John Naish in 1721, but these were then put on hold.

Officially a rebuild of the previous vessel, the new Victory was then built by master shipwright Joseph Allin and cost £38,239 to assemble, plus £12,652 fitting it as a flagship. Launched in 1737, she became the flagship of the Channel Fleet under Sir John Norris following completion in 1740. She was the last British first rate to be armed entirely with bronze cannon.

The Victory was "a high-sided ship for her draught and this was believed to have made her leewardly and to have led to her loss". The term "leewardly" means she had an unusual tendency to be pushed to leeward (down wind) when sailing with the wind on or forward of the beam, increasing the risk of being driven ashore. A plan of the ship reproduced in Howard and an extant contemporary model also show her with four rows of lights (stern galleries), three open balconies along her stern, and four quarter galleries, one more of each than was usual for a British three-decker. These expansive features improved her internal capacity and conditions for the crew, but were heavy enough to compromise her stability in rough weather. Their addition to the ship reflected a long-running dispute between Jacob Acworth, the Surveyor of the Navy and representative of the Admiralty Board, and master shipwright Allin, who had carriage of the ship's actual construction. Acworth had instructed Allin that Admiralty required the ship's upper works to be "low and snug"; but Allin, jealous of his prerogatives as a shipwright, refused to follow this direction and instead built a particularly large and roomy craft. The completed ship was so incompetent a sailer, she required several refits before she passed her sea trials.

Victory carried 28 guns on each of her gundecks, but with an additional set of unused gunports to the aft of the middle deck. She was one of the last Royal Navy ships to carry a full complement of bronze cannons; after her loss the Navy switched to cheaper iron-made weapons for all first- and second-rate ships. One of the 42-pounder guns recovered from Victory is extremely rare, being the only gun of its type recovered from a Royal Navy shipwreck. It was made by Swiss-born Andrew Schalch at Royal the Brass Foundry in Woolwich, in 1723. It is now on display at the National Museum of the Royal Navy in Portsmouth.

== Loss ==
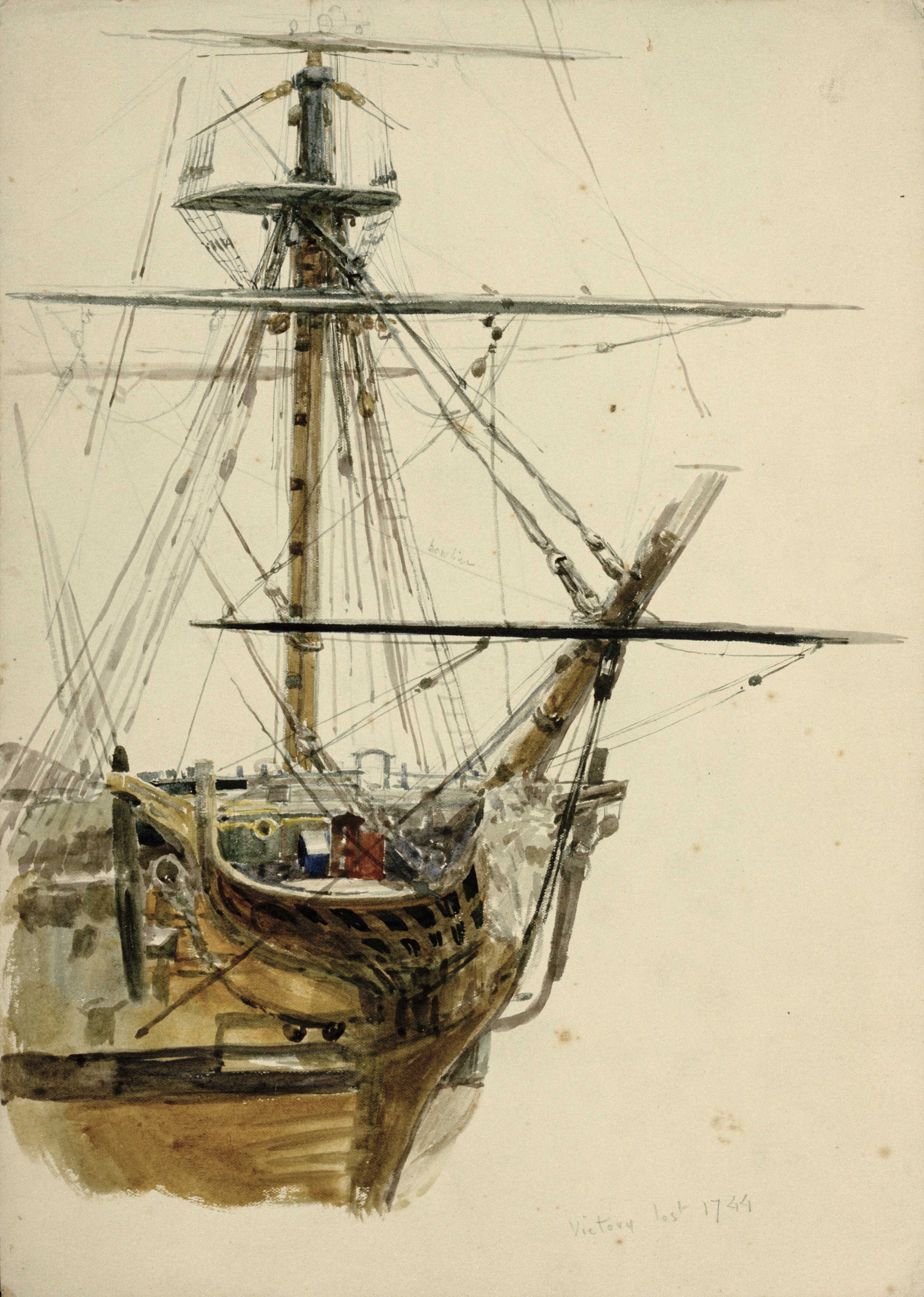
Victory, by William Lionel Wyllie

Victory was wrecked, with the loss of her entire crew, while returning to England as the flagship of Admiral Sir John Balchen after relieving Sir Charles Hardy, who was blockaded in the Tagus estuary by the French Brest fleet during the War of Austrian Succession. As Balchen's fleet reached the English Channel on 3 October 1744, it was scattered by a large storm. At around 15:30 on 4 October, the ships accompanying Victory lost sight of her near the Channel Islands. For over 260 years she was believed to have been wrecked during the night on Black Rock just off the Casquets.

Frigates were dispatched across the English Channel to search for her where she was last seen wallowing on the horizon on 4 October. Eventually, Captain Thomas Grenville of HMS Falkland landed at Guernsey in the Channel Islands to provision, and there heard from locals that wreckage and part of a topmast had been seen on the island's shores. Further investigation proved that the wreckage did indeed come from Victory, which was believed to have run into the Casquets, a group of rocks nearby. Other wreckage washed up on Jersey and Alderney, whose inhabitants had heard distress guns the night before but were unable to provide aid in the severe storm. No trace of Victory's 1,150 sailors was found until the wreck was discovered in 2008.

== Discovery ==
On 1 February 2009, the Associated Press reported that Odyssey Marine Exploration, based in Tampa, Florida, United States, claimed to have found the wreck in May 2008, and had recovered two of the 100 bronze cannons. Located in the Western Approaches between England and France, as a military wreck she remains the property of the British Government under the laws of marine salvage. The wreck was found "more than 80 km (43 nm) from where anybody would have thought it went down", according to Odyssey Marine Exploration CEO Gregg Stemm, and 100 m (330 ft) deep, meaning that the vessel had not foundered on the Casquets as surmised, but lay approximately at 49°42.5′N 3°3.33′W. The team announced their findings on 2 February and stated that they were negotiating with the British government over the wreckage. On 26 March 2009, the TV show Treasure Quest, which had followed the company's ship Odyssey Explorer as it explored several different shipwrecks, aired two hours of footage of the Odyssey Explorer's initial findings of Victory, including the crew's discovery of a 42-pounder cannon that identified the remains of the Victory. The crew raised two cannon, a 42-pounder and a 12-pounder, which are now on display at Portsmouth Historic Dockyard. In 2011, a Dutch salvage company was caught with an illegally looted cannon from the site.

In January 2012 it was reported that the remains of HMS Victory were to be raised from the seabed, and are to be given to the Maritime Heritage Foundation, which is expected to employ Odyssey Marine Exploration for the recovery. The terms of the contract remain controversial, with concerns over "allowing foreign investors to profit from the property, grave and memorial of Royal Navy personnel".

== Possible treasure ==
Research has backed up anecdotal evidence of the possibility that Victory was carrying gold and silver which could be worth hundreds of millions of pounds. At the time of the sinking, Lisbon was the bullion capital of Europe and the Mediterranean. Following the blockade of the river Tagus, there was a backlog of bullion to transport to England, and Royal Navy ships were often used to transport private coinage. In addition, Balchen had recently captured six prize ships and could have been carrying their assets. The Amsterdamsche Courant of 18/19 November 1744 reported that a huge sum of money was being carried by the flagship when she foundered: “People will have it that on board of the Victory was a sum of 400,000 pounds sterling that it had brought from Lisbon for our merchants.” This would equate to approximately 4 tons of gold coins.
