= Treasure Quest (TV series) =

- Genre: Reality
- Country of origin: United States
- Original language: English
- No. of seasons: 1
- No. of episodes: 12

Production
- Running time: 60 minutes (per episode)

Original release
- Network: Discovery Channel
- Release: January 15 – April 2, 2009

Related
- Treasure Quest: Snake Island (2015–2018)

Treasure Quest is a one-hour weekly American reality television series that premiered on January 15, 2009 on the Discovery Channel. The program follows the employees of Odyssey Marine Exploration as they search the English Channel for various lost ships. The team is led by company CEO Gregory Stemm and Tom Dettweiler (operations director of Robert Ballard's team that discovered the RMS Titanic).

== Notable shipwrecks discovered ==
- Nuestra Señora de las Mercedes (Our Lady of Mercy in English) - Spanish frigate which was sunk by the British off the south coast of Portugal on 5 October 1804 during the Battle of Cape Santa Maria. The TV episode was produced believing the wreck to be the Royal Merchant, but later investigation now points to it being the Nuestra Señora de las Mercedes. The recovered treasure had to be returned to Spain after a U.S. Supreme Court ruling.
- Marqise de Tornay - A French privateer.
- HMS Victory - A first-rate ship of the line of the British Royal Navy.
- RMS Laconia - An ocean liner transformed into an armed merchant cruiser during World War I, sunk by a German U-boat. Also known as the Silver Queen due to the precious metals on board when sunk.
- U-103 - A German U-boat in WWI, sunk by the RMS Olympic

== See also ==
- Black Swan Project
- Legend Quest
- Merchant Royal
