= RMS Laconia (1911) =

1911 ocean liner

Coordinates: 52°0′N 13°40′W

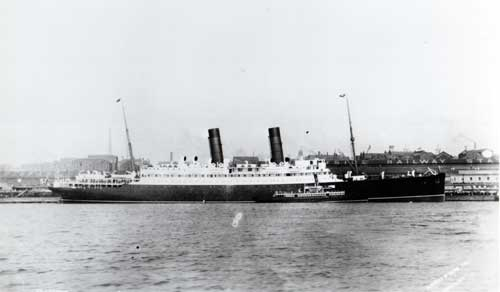
- RMS Laconia at Liverpool with the SS Skirmisher.

History

United Kingdom
- Name: RMS Laconia
- Namesake: Laconia in the Peloponnese
- Owner: Cunard Line
- Operator: Cunard Line
- Port of registry: (United Kingdom) Liverpool
- Builder: Swan Hunter, Wallsend
- Launched: 27 July 1911
- Acquired: 12 December 1911
- Maiden voyage: 20 January 1912
- Fate: Torpedoed and sunk 25 February 1917

General characteristics
- Type: Ocean liner
- Tonnage: 18,099 GRT
- Length: 183 m (600 ft 5 in)
- Beam: 22 m (72 ft 2 in)
- Installed power: Eight-cylinder quadruple-expansion engines by Wallsend Slipway & Engineering Company
- Propulsion: Twin propellers
- Speed: 17 knots (31 km/h; 20 mph)
- Capacity: Passenger accommodations: 300 1st class; 350 2nd class; 2,200 3rd class; 2,850 total

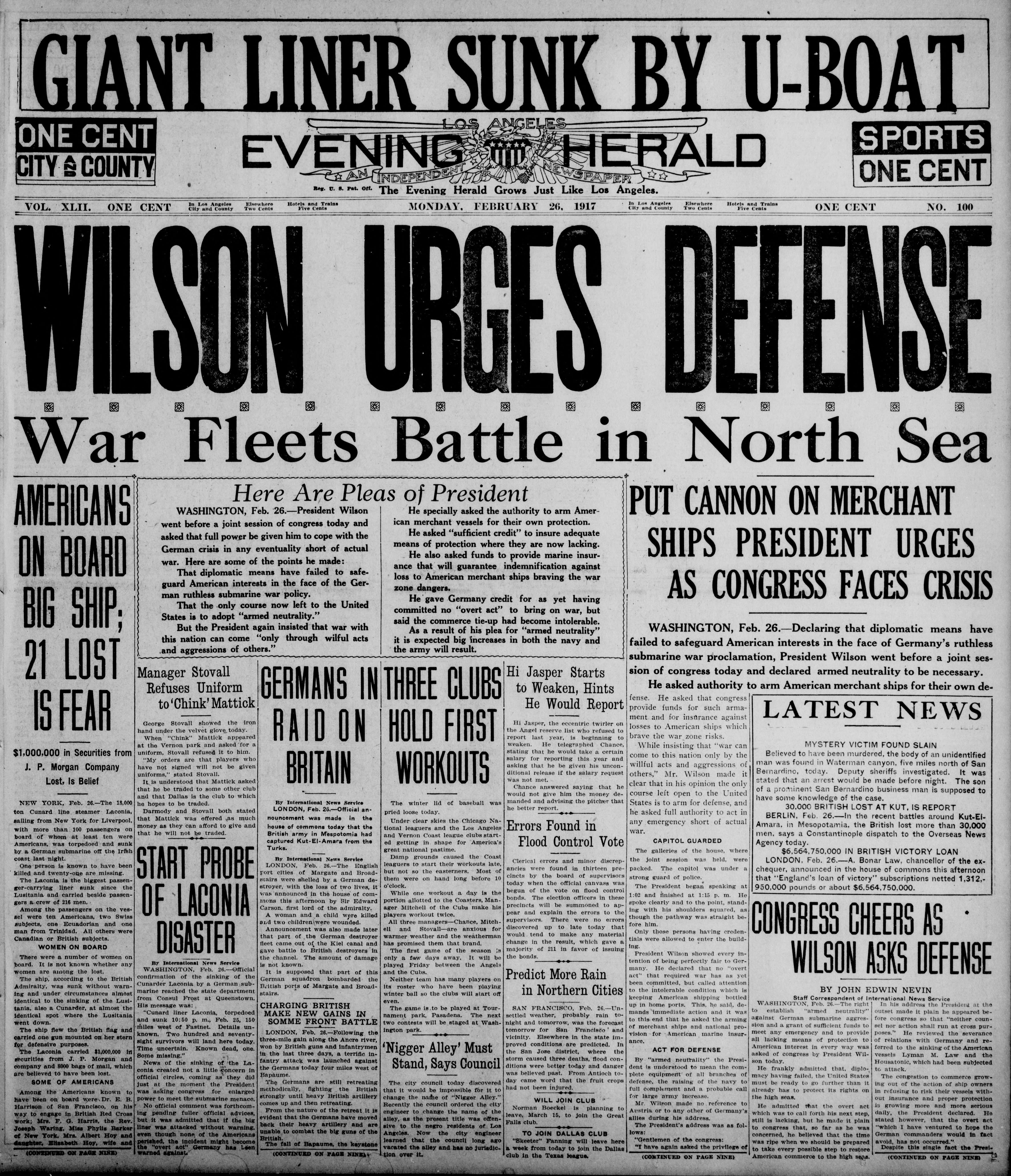
The sinking of RMS Laconia newspaper report, 26 February 1917

RMS Laconia was a Cunard ocean liner built by Swan Hunter & Wigham Richardson, launched on 27 July 1911, with the wife of the U.S. Ambassador Mrs. Whitelaw Reid christening the vessel. Laconia was delivered to the Cunard Line on 12 December 1911, and began service on 20 January 1912. She was the first Cunard ship of that name. She was torpedoed and sunk on 25 February 1917 during World War I; 12 passengers were killed.

Laconia was intended for the Liverpool-Boston service with cruising from New York to the Mediterranean off season. The ship was the first British ship and first North Atlantic liner to be equipped with anti-roll tanks.

== Drafted into war service ==
On the outbreak of World War I, Laconia was converted into an armed merchant cruiser in 1914. She was fitted with eight 6-inch (152 mm) guns and for a time she carried two seaplanes, which were housed on the quarterdeck. She was based at Simon's Town, South Africa, in the South Atlantic, from which she patrolled the South Atlantic and Indian Ocean until April 1915. She was then used as a headquarters ship stationed at Zanzibar and engaged in operations for the capture of Tanga and the colony of German East Africa. She was mainly employed on patrol duties but, on one occasion, was engaged at the bombardment of Tanga. She continued to serve on the East Africa station, and made several trips from Durban and Cape Town with troops for the army in British East Africa. Laconia returned home to the UK with a convoy in June 1916, with a large shipment of gold ingots from Cape Town, and was paid off at Devonport.

== Returned to Cunard ==
She was handed back to Cunard in July 1916 and on 9 September resumed service.

On 25 February 1917, she was torpedoed by SM U-50 six nautical miles (11 km) northwest by west of Fastnet while returning from the United States to England with 75 passengers (34 first class and 41 second class) and a crew of 217 commanded by Captain Irvine. The first torpedo struck the liner on the starboard side just abaft the engine room but did not sink her. 20 minutes later a second torpedo exploded in the engine room, again on the starboard side, and the vessel sank at 10:20 pm. A total of 12 people were killed: six crew and six passengers. Two of the killed passengers were American citizens. The death of the two Americans stirred up public opinion in the neutral United States against the Germans and raised public support for the country entering the war.

Chicago Tribune reporter Floyd Gibbons was aboard Laconia when she was torpedoed and gained fame from his dispatches about the attack, his graphic account of the sinking read to both Houses of Congress and was credited with helping to push the United States into joining the war.

== Rediscovery ==
In March 2009, it was announced that the wreck of Laconia was located in November 2008 and claimed by Odyssey Marine Exploration, Inc., a commercial archaeology company in Tampa, Florida. She was found about 160 nautical miles (300 km) off of the coast of Ireland. "Britain claims it is the legitimate owner of the wrecks because, under a wartime insurance scheme, it paid the owners of the vessels when they sank, in effect making the remains the property of the taxpayer." The search for the wreck was featured on an episode of Discovery Channel's Treasure Quest titled "The Silver Queen". Items salvaged were 852 bars of silver and 132 boxes of silver coins worth an estimated £3m. One of the artifacts recovered during their investigation of the wreck happened to be the remains of a left shoe that likely belonged to one of the ship's female passengers.

== Bibliography ==
- Osborne, Richard; Spong, Harry & Grover, Tom (2007). Armed Merchant Cruisers 1878–1945. Windsor, UK: World Warship Society. ISBN 978-0-9543310-8-5.
