= The Vault (2021 film) =

2021 Spanish action thriller film

- Theatrical release poster
- Directed by: Jaume Balagueró
- Written by: Rowan Athale; Michel Gaztambide; Borja Glez. Santaolalla; Andres Koppel; Rafa Martínez
- Produced by: Álvaro Augustin; Ghislain Barrois; Freddie Highmore; Eneko Lizarraga; Francisco Sánchez
- Starring: Freddie Highmore; Àstrid Bergès-Frisbey; Sam Riley; Liam Cunningham; Luis Tosar; Axel Stein; José Coronado; Famke Janssen
- Cinematography: Daniel Aranyó
- Edited by: David Gallart
- Music by: Arnau Bataller
- Production companies: TF1 Studio; ESCine Español; Mediterraneo
- Distributed by: TF1 Studio (Worldwide); Sony Pictures Releasing International (Spain)
- Release dates: January 15, 2021 (Brazil & Taiwan); November 12, 2021 (Spain)
- Running time: 118 minutes
- Country: Spain
- Language: English
- Budget: €15 million
- Box office: $9 million

The Vault, titled Way Down in various regions, (Note: The film was titled Way Down in Spain and other European, South American, and Asian countries.) is a 2021 Spanish heist action thriller film directed by Jaume Balagueró. The film stars Freddie Highmore, Àstrid Bergès-Frisbey, Sam Riley, Liam Cunningham, Luis Tosar, Axel Stein, José Coronado and Famke Janssen. The story bears a passing resemblance to that of the Black Swan Project, recovered in 2007 by Odyssey Marine Exploration, a private marine salvage firm, but later turned over to Spain after 5 years of legal wrangling.

== Plot ==
In July 2010, Thom Johnson is a gifted engineering student at Cambridge University who is being courted by recruiters from several major oil companies, all promising him increasingly richer salaries and job perks if he agrees to work for them. Thom dismisses the offers, later explaining to his oil executive father over dinner that he does not want the life that a career in the oil industry would bring him. During this conversation, he receives an anonymous text message from somebody observing him in the restaurant who tells him to meet at a club.

He goes to the location he is instructed and meets a woman named Lorraine, who then introduces him to Walter, who runs a salvaging company that had recovered a large treasure known as "the treasure of Guadalupe" but it was seized by the Spanish government because Walter's company was not legally salvaging the site.

Walter has put together a team consisting members with various skillsets including Lorraine, a con artist; Simon, a logistics expert; Klaus, a computer hacker; and James, Walter's longtime treasure-hunting partner (whom they worked together on attempting to retrieve Francis Drake's treasure 10 months prior in 2009). Walter needs Thom's engineering genius to help them breach the vault that holds the confiscated treasure inside the Bank of Spain. Thom agrees to help and joins them in Madrid during the 2010 World Cup as Spain is contending for the championship title. Using the crowd noise from the many fans gathered in the city to watch the matches as cover, they scout the bank and determine that the vault sits on a giant scale underneath a large water reservoir. If the weight on the scale fluctuates in the slightest, the vault floods, drowning any intruders who might be inside.

After spending days to find a solution before the finals, Thom accepts Lorraine’s invite to go to a bar to unwind, where he sees a bartender make a cocktail drink that gives him the solution to the mechanics of the vault. Thom determines that they can defeat the scale by freezing it with 500 liters of nitrogen, slowing the mechanics of the scale long enough that it would not register their presence and trigger a flood while they retrieve the treasure.

They move forward with their plan, with Simon successfully freezing the scale beneath the floor of the vault while Thom, Lorraine, and James perilously make their way inside. Thom’s plan has worked and they rush to retrieve the box containing a collection of three coins from Sir Francis Drake that describe where to find his massive treasure hoard.

As they locate the coins, Gustavo, the head of bank security, has regained control of his systems after they were unknowingly penetrated by Klaus days earlier. Having learned in the days prior that the team had already infiltrated the bank to scout it, he dispatches a strike team to arrest the intruders. Believing they are compromised, Walter tells the trio to surrender to the team. James then pulls a gun on Thom, refusing to surrender, and demands Thom hand over the coins, revealing that he is working for the British government. The vault locks down trapping them inside, however, James' diving experience affords him the ability to swim to safety and he abandons the other two.

Running out of time, Thom suspects that the key to stopping the flow of water into the vault is tricking the scale by adding more weight and making it think the vault is full of water. He instructs Simon to stack the empty nitrogen canisters onto the scale for additional weight, but it is not enough to halt the flow of water. The team loses contact with Thom and Lorraine, believing they have drowned, until as a last resort Simon himself climbs onto the scale with a radio broadcasting the world cup commentary, with the last bit of weight ceasing the water flow.

The vault begins to drain, and Thom and Lorraine are able to evade the bank security as they escape to the square where many fans watch Spain defeat the Netherlands for their first World Cup title, sharing a kiss before more soldiers arrive.

At the British Embassy, James reports to Margaret, an MI6 associate of both his and Walter’s, and delivers the coins, only to find out that the coins are fakes and that Walter is still in possession of the originals. As the team relaxes in Saint Tropez, Walter finds that the treasure is buried under the Bank of England. A new heist begins two years later as the 2012 Olympics begin in London.

== Cast ==
- Freddie Highmore as Thom Johnson, a 22 year engineering student at Cambridge University who joins Walter's team
- Àstrid Bergès-Frisbey as Lorraine, a con artist, Walter's surrogate daughter and later Thom's girlfriend
- Sam Riley as James, a former MI6 agent
- Liam Cunningham as Walter Moreland, owner of a salvaging company
- Luis Tosar as Simón, a logistics expert
- Axel Stein as Klaus, a computer hacker
- José Coronado as Gustavo Medina, the head of security of Bank of Spain
- Famke Janssen as Margaret, an MI6 intelligence officer
- Emilio Gutiérrez Caba as Bank of Spain Chairman

== Release ==
The Vault was released theatrically on January 15, 2021 in Brazil and Taiwan, and in March in the U.S. On July 31, it was made available on Netflix. On Amazon Prime Video in the U.K.

In Spain, the film was initially intended to be theatrically released in autumn 2020, but the release was postponed to November 12, 2021 due to the COVID-19 pandemic, which caused the shelving of all Telecinco Cinema titles pending for theatrical release.

== Box office ==
It opened with €1.2 million on its first weekend in Spain, becoming the best Spanish box-office debut so far in the year in that regard. The film grossed $9 million worldwide ($6.9 million in Spain).

== Reception ==
On the review aggregator website Rotten Tomatoes, 60% of 30 critics' reviews are positive, with an average rating of 5.8/10. The website's critics consensus reads, "Its runtime passes painlessly enough, but The Vault's slickly engineered thrills are dulled by familiarity." Metacritic, which uses a weighted average, assigned the film a score of 50 out of 100, based on 4 critics, indicating "mixed or average" reviews.

== See also ==
- List of Spanish films of 2021
