= Phoenician shipwrecks of Mazarrón =

7th or 6th century BC wrecks off Spain's coast

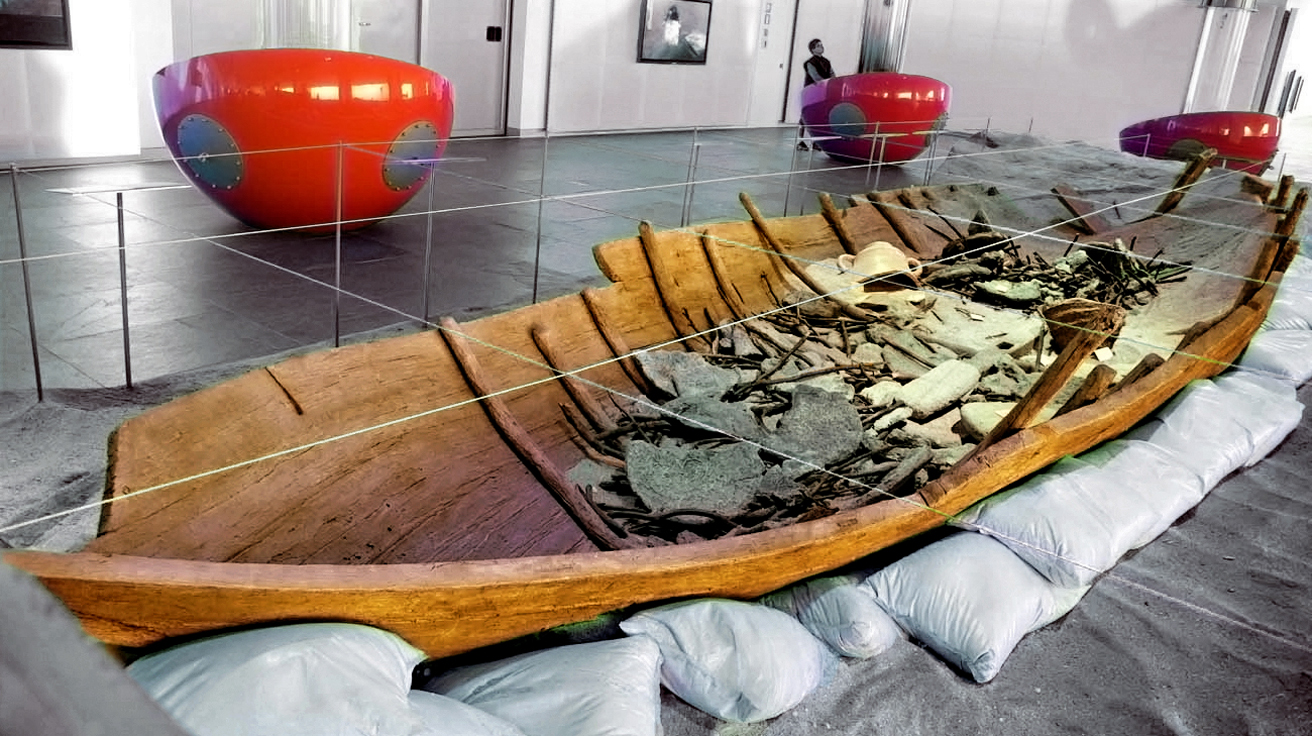
- Reconstruction of the Phoenician shipwreck Mazarron II in the National Museum of Subaquatic Archaeology (ARQUA)

- Location within Spain
- 37°33′34″N 1°16′6″W
- Type: Site of a sunken ship
- Periods: Iron Age
- Cultures: Phoenician, Iberian
- Location: Playa de la Isla , off the coast of Mazarrón, Spain

History
- Built: 7th–6th century BC
- Abandoned: 7th–6th century BC

Site notes
- Discovered: 1988 (Mazarrón I); 1994 (Mazarrón II)
- Condition: Conserved at the National Museum of Subaquatic Archaeology in Cartagena
- Owner: Spain

The Phoenician shipwrecks of Mazarrón are two wrecks dated to the 7th century BC, found off the coast of Mazarrón, in the Region of Murcia, Spain. The shipwreck site was identified in 1988 by archaeologists from the Spanish National Museum of Maritime Archaeology and the National Center for Underwater Archaeological Research. In July 1991, the remains of a first ship, dubbed Mazarrón I, were identified, and has undergone excavation, extraction, and restoration since 1993. It is currently on display at the Museum of Underwater Archaeology in Cartagena. The second shipwreck, dubbed Mazarrón II, was discovered in 1994, and was found in a better state of preservation. After years of study, its was extracted in November 2024.

The shipwrecks demonstrates hybrid shipbuilding techniques including pegged mortise and tenon joints, as well as sewn seams during the Iron Age. In 2009, the Centro de Interpretación del Barco Fenicio del Puerto de Mazarrón (Interpretation Center of the Phoenician Ship of the Port of Mazarrón) was inaugurated.

== Discovery, excavation and exhibition ==
The shipwreck site was identified in 1988 during coastal surveys off the coast of the Playa de la Isla and the Isla del Puerto in Mazarrón; the construction of a marina altered the local currents and exposed a ship's wooden structures. The discovery was made by archaeologists from the Spanish National Museum of Subaquatic Archaeology and the National Center for Underwater Archaeological Research. Between 1988 and 1995, excavation and fieldwork activities at Playa de la Isla were directed by archaeologist Juan Pinedo Reyes. In July 1991, the remains of a first wooden vessel, dubbed Mazarrón I, was identified. Between October 1993 and June 1995, the Mazarrón I wreck underwent systematic surveying and documentation as part of the "Nave Fenicia" project. In 1994, the remains of a second shipwreck, later named Mazarrón II, were discovered and kept in situ. In 1995, the remains of the Mazarrón I hull were recovered. In September 2024, the remains of Mazarrón II were raised from the seabed after years of study.

In June 2009, the Centro de Interpretación del Barco Fenicio del Puerto de Mazarrón was inaugurated to showcase the history and significance of the Phoenician ships Mazarrón I and Mazarrón II. It features audiovisual exhibits, models, and educational displays contextualizing the Phoenician presence in the region.

== Description ==
=== Mazarrón I ===
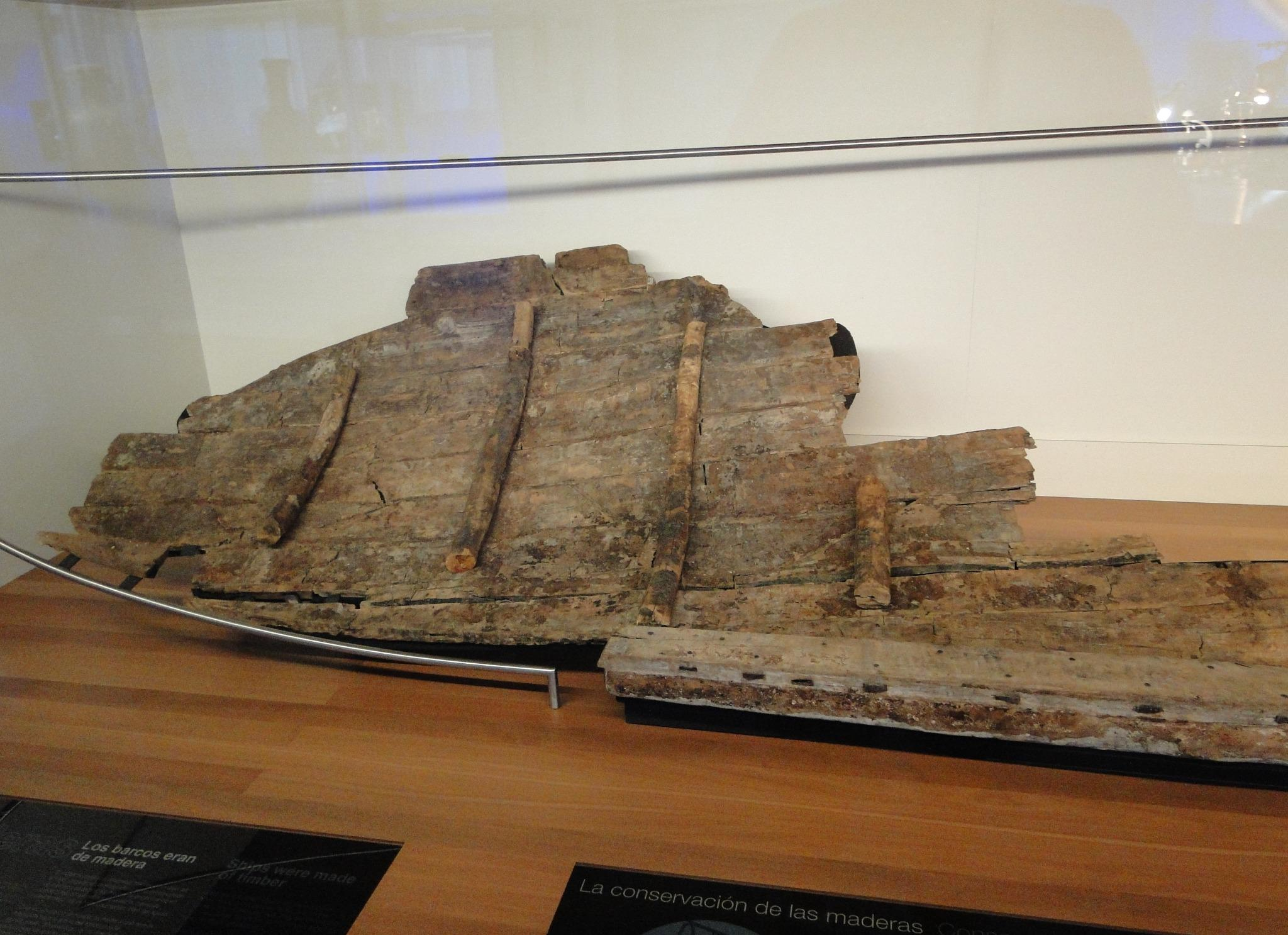
Remains of Mazarron I

The wreck of Mazarrón I, found about 50 meters (160 ft) from the shore at a depth of 2.5 meters (8.2 ft), was sealed under a layer of dead Mediterranean tapeweed The Mazarrón I shipwreck was discovered in an incomplete state, but with relatively well-preserved timber components. The surviving remains include a nearly complete keel, nine incomplete planking strakes, and four incomplete and fragmented frames.

Unlike the hull of Mazarrón II, that of Mazarrón I featured meticulous longitudinal stitching along the seams in addition to the pegged mortise-and-tenon fasteners. According to modern reconstructions completed by Spanish maritime archeologist Carlos Cabrera Tejedor, the ship measured 8.2–2.2 m (26.9–7.2 ft), and was around one meter (3.3 ft) deep. The keel of Mazarrón I, was nearly intact but degraded at the aft end, measured 3.98 meters (13.1 ft) in length. Its wood was identified as Mediterranean cypress which was mistakenly described as cedar in earlier excavation reports. The keel had a distinctive T-shaped scarf connecting it to the stem, with two perpendicular tenons for stability under vertical stress. The aft end of the keel likely featured a similar scarf, though damage obscured confirmation. Mazarrón I features hybrid shipbuilding techniques; the strakes were fastened combining pegged mortise-and-tenon joints and sewn seams. These mortises were approximately 30–36 mm (1.2–1.4 in), 9–10 mm (0.35–0.39 in) thick, and 60–80 mm (2.4–3.1 in) deep. Tenons were tightly fitted, with cylindrical pegs 7–10 mm (0.28–0.39 in) in diameter. The longitudinal stitching observed on the Mazarrón I planks, used thin ropes made of esparto grass for waterproofing. The planking consisted of nine incomplete strakes with widths ranging 130–140 mm (5.1–5.5 in), except for the eighth strake, which was wider and possibly reused from an earlier hull. The four frames are cylindrical, made of crudely cut fig wood, 60–80 mm (2.4–3.1 in) in diameter. A protective coating of pine tar covered the hull, applied internally and externally.

=== Mazarrón II ===
The Mazarrón II is a nearly complete 7th-century Phoenician shipwreck discovered in 1994 by divers. Almost the entire vessel was found preserved from bow to stern. It measures 8.1 meters (27 ft) in length, 2.5 meters (8.2 ft) in beam, and an approximate depth of 11 meters (36 ft). It is located in the Mediterranean off the coast of Mazarrón, Spain. The Mazarrón II shipwreck retains nearly all of its frames made from fig tree wood, except for one, which are sewn together with plant fibers. The pine planking that forms the hull is fastened using a system of dowels, and plant fibers were employed to caulk the seams. The wreck was kept under a protective metal cover that was installed in 2000 at the discovery site.

After two years of studies, in March 2021, the Spanish Ministry of Culture and Sports approved the extraction of the Mazarrón II shipwreck for its exhibition at the National Museum of Subaquatic Archaeology in Cartagena. The extraction project involved the UNESCO, and the University of Valencia (UV), with the excavation team led by Agustín Ángel Diez Castillo, Head of the UV Department of Prehistory, Archaeology and Ancient History, and UV underwater archaeologist Carlos de Juan Fuertes. Fuertes commented about the excavation in July 2024: "...The wreckage can no longer remain where it is because its sand protection is now disappearing. The wreckage has survived for centuries, but now it is time to roll up our sleeves and ensure that we can continue to enjoy this asset of cultural interest." The project culminated with the successful recovery of the ship that began on 13 September 2024, and was completed on 7 November 2024.

== Cargo ==
The Mazarrón II shipwreck preserves all of its elements in their original position and curvature, in contrast to the Mazarrón I, whose material and cargo was found scattered. Over 7,300 Phoenician ceramic fragments were documented, comprising more than 70% of the finds. These included parts of amphorae, cooking pots, bowls, plates, and cups. Additionally, stone and metal artifacts were recovered, including a silver scarab and a spearhead, one of the few examples of Atlantic Bronze Age metallurgy found in the Mediterranean. The cargo of both ships was primarily composed of litharge blocks for silver production, and nearly the entire cargo has been preserved in Mazarrón II, with 2,820 kilograms recovered. The cargo of the Mazarrón II shipwreck, which was extracted between October 1999 and January 2001, included a ceramic amphora, a plant fiber basket with a wooden handle, a hand mill, and several animal bone fragments. Additionally, the ship contained a wooden and lead anchor. The cargoes of both ships are currently on display at the National Museum of Subaquatic Archaeology in Cartagena.

== Research ==
=== Sinking and dating ===
Researchers from the University of Valencia believe that the Mazarrón ships sank as a result of a heavy storm at La Playa de la Isla, an area typically known for its calm waters. The ships were rapidly buried by sand, preventing the recovery of their valuable cargo. Researcher Carlos de Juan Fuertes noted that this sandy deposit acted as a protective barrier, preserving the wrecks to the present day. The Mazarrón ships are dated to the second half of the 7th century BC based on archaeological evidence. Surveys at the Playa de la Isla site recovered more than 7,300 pottery sherds, 70–80% of which were Phoenician. These Phoenician ceramics displayed a consistent chronology from the second half of the 7th century BC, with no sherds definitively belonging to earlier or later centuries. Radiocarbon dating of wood samples from Mazarrón II timbers aligns with these findings. Further refinement of Mazarrón II's date, based on an on-board Trayamar-1 amphora used for storing fresh water, suggests a range of 625–570 BC. Another analysis proposes a slightly later date within the first third of the 6th century BC.

=== Function and interpretation ===
Mortise and tenon joints strengthened with dowels, as used in the construction of the hulls of triremes.

According to Tejedor, the Mazarrón I shipwreck combines pegged mortise-and-tenon joinery with longitudinal stitching. Tenons were spaced closer in lower hull sections and wider in upper sections, where stitching was used to fasten planks and ensure watertight seams. The stitching involved thin ropes secured in grooves and required thousands of holes to install. While mortise-and-tenon joinery alone could create a watertight hull, the stitching may have been a conservative measure or an integral design feature to strengthen the structure. The absence of stitching in areas above the waterline and its durability under stress indicate it was used to maintain hull integrity.Cabrera Tejedor interprets the combination of techniques as reflecting Phoenician shipbuilding practice alongside an indigenous Iberian sewn-plank tradition.

The Mazarrón I was a trade vessel, likely propelled by both a mast and square sail as well as oars. With a shallow draft and light, maneuverable hull, it was suited for coastal, riverine, and wetland navigation rather than open-sea voyages, and could carry up to 4 tonnes (8,800 lb) of cargo. The ship was found in a Phoenician context on the Iberian Peninsula, and likely served a Phoenician commercial enterprise. Evidence of integration Phoenician shipbuilding technology, like the pegged mortise-and-tenon joinery with indigenous plank stitching technique, suggests it was constructed in Iberia.

== Gallery ==
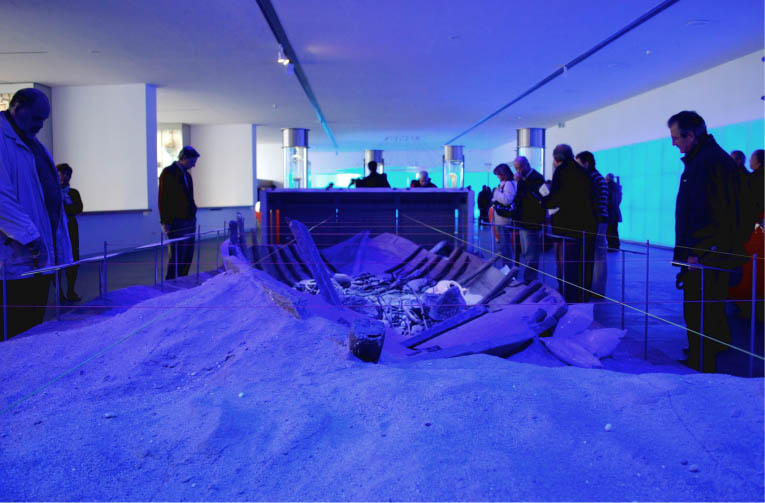
Reconstruction of the Phoenician Ship Mazarrón II

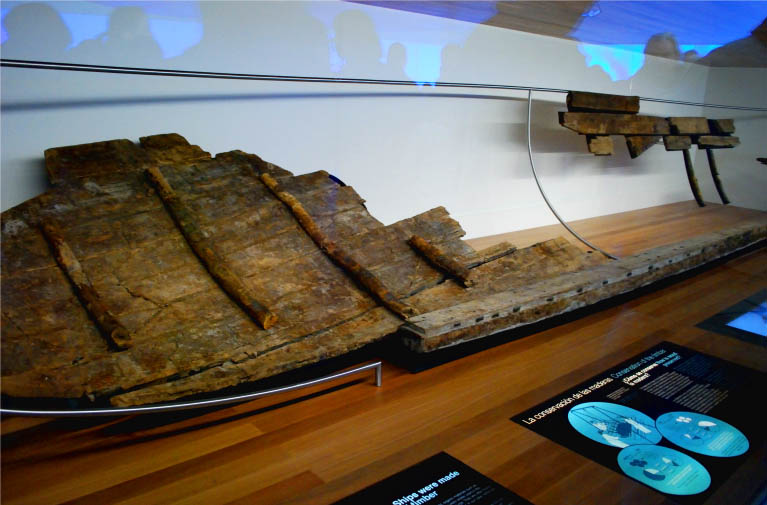
Original remains of the Mazarrón I wreck

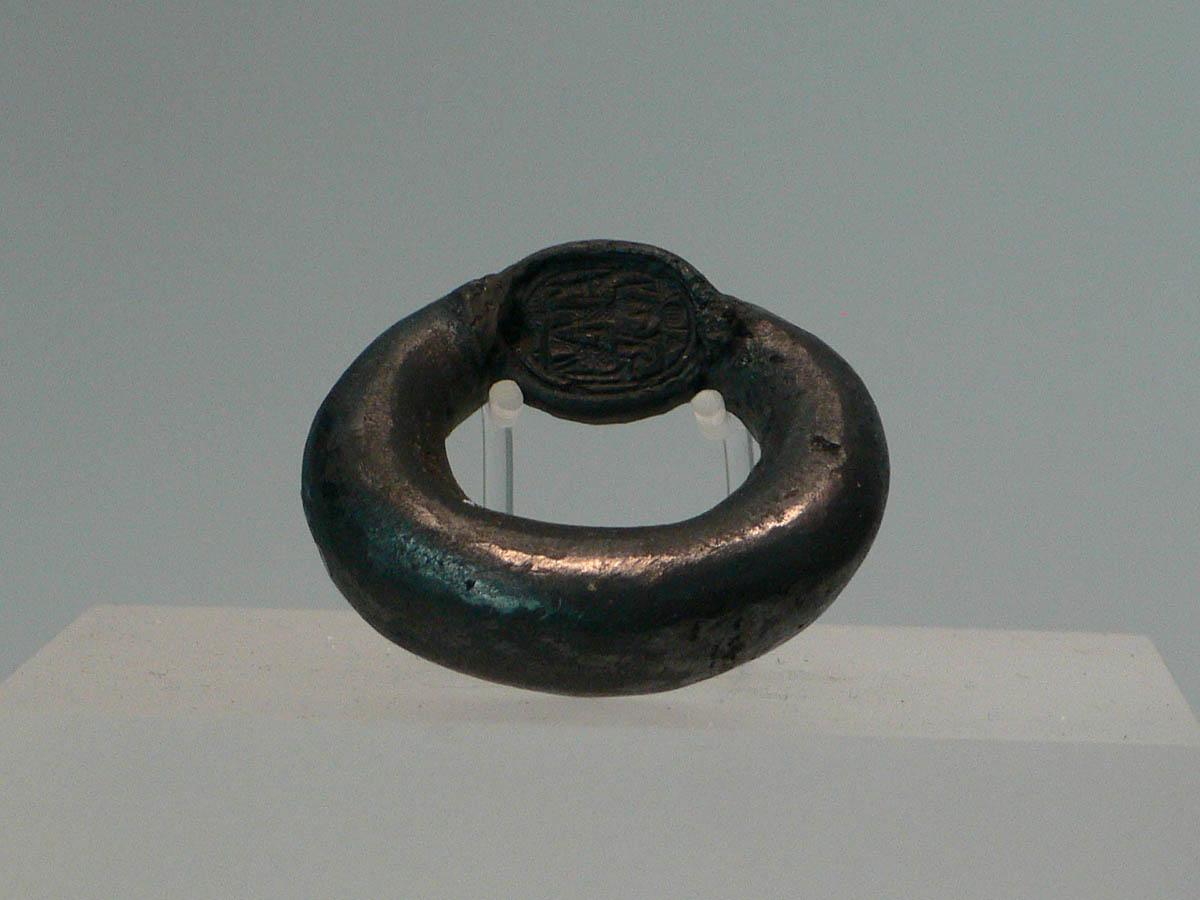
Phoenician ring from the Mazarrón II wreck

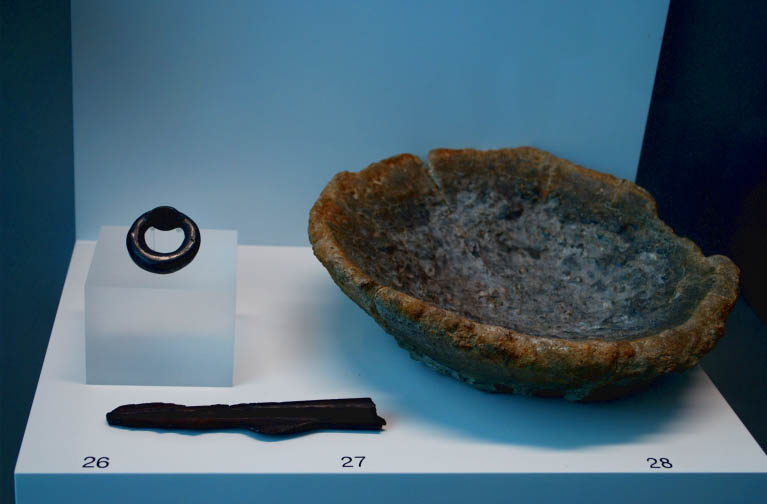
Part of the cargo of the Phoenician ship

== See also ==
- List of surviving ancient ships
