= Jan Verbruggen =

Master gun-founder and Dutch painter (1712-1781)

Jan Verbruggen (1712 – 27 October 1781) was a master gun-founder in the Dutch Republic and later at the Royal Arsenal in Woolwich, London. He was also an artist.

== Early life and career ==
He was born in 1712 in Enkhuizen in the Netherlands, son of Pieter Verbruggen and Maria Brouwer. In 1734 he married Eva van Schaack, and they had three children.

In 1740, he became gun-founder of the Dutch admiralty's foundry in Enkhuizen, and from June 1755 he was master gun-founder in The Hague. After a few years he was suspended, the guns produced being considered unsound; his attempt in 1763 to obtain an appointment at the Royal Arsenal in Woolwich, London was unsuccessful.

=== Artist ===
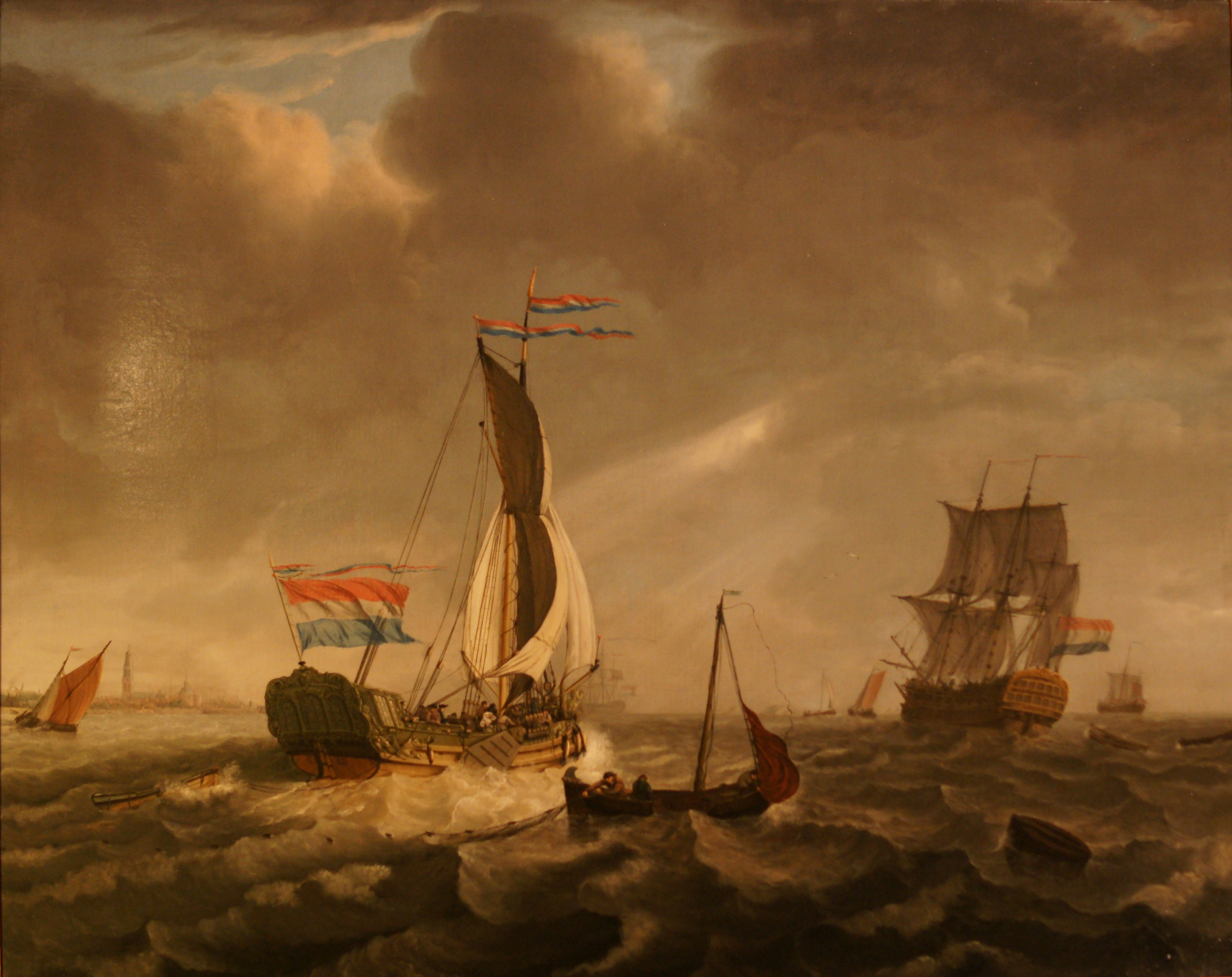
V.O.C. yacht approaching the East Indiaman de Vrindschap, by Jan Verbruggen (1766)

Verbruggen, a student of the artist Jan van Call the Younger, was also a painter of seascapes and coastal scenery, such as pictures of yachts and East Indiamen at or near Enkhuizen.

== At the Royal Arsenal ==
By 1769 the British government's contracted gun-founders, William Bowers and Richard Gilpin, were due to retire, and Andrew Schalch, the master founder at the Royal Arsenal since 1718, produced few guns; his work had been considered unsatisfactory for several years. In consequence, on 12 January 1770 Jan and his son Pieter (1735–1786) were appointed master founders at the Royal Arsenal.

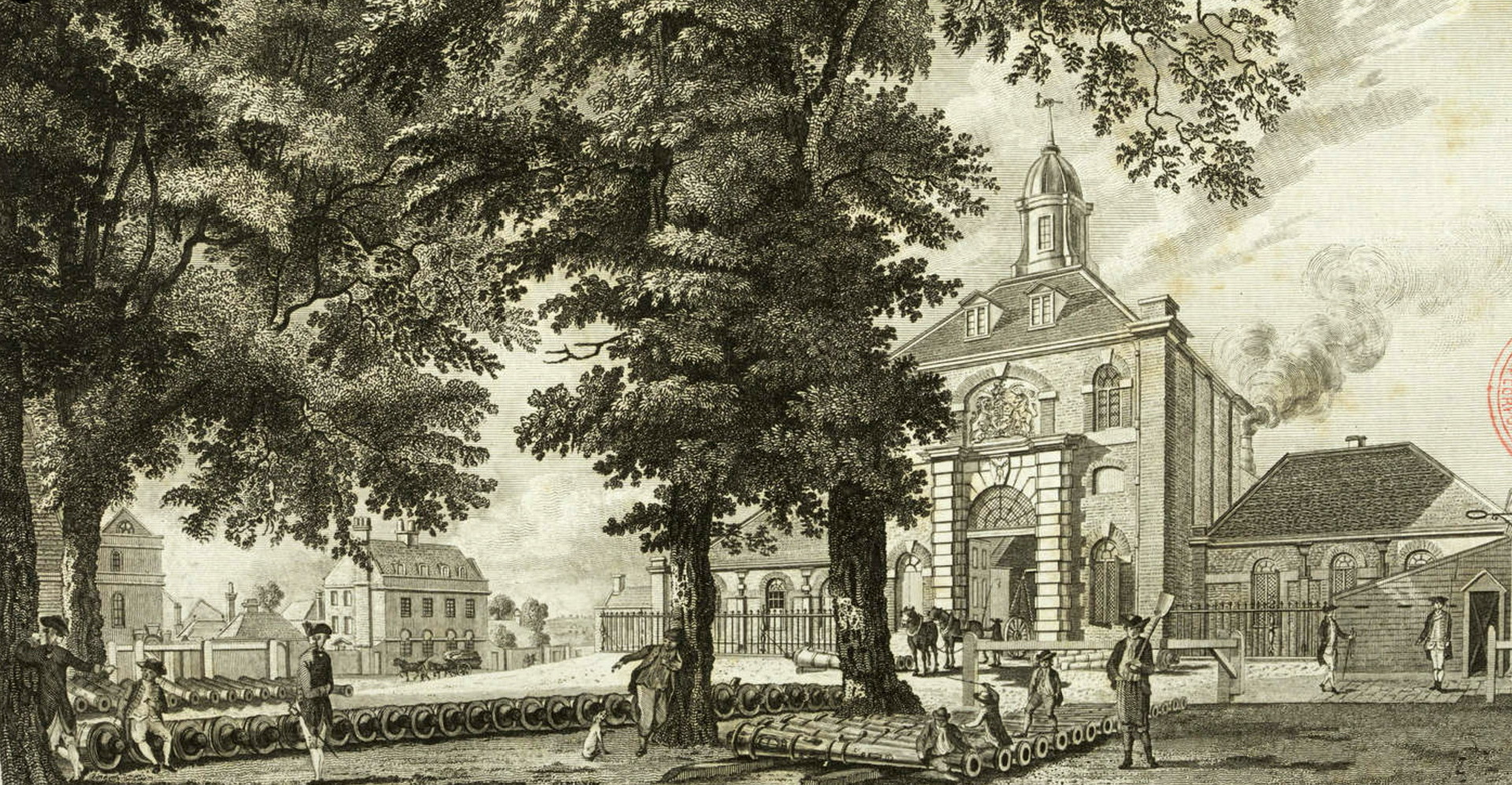
The Royal Brass Foundry at Woolwich; Verbruggen's House is on the left. Engraving by James Fittler.

In May 1770 they moved to England. At the Royal Brass Foundry they introduced a horizontal boring machine, for guns cast solid (instead of vertically reaming guns cast round a core); this system had been installed by Verbruggen at The Hague in the 1750s. They also rebuilt the furnaces and casting pits, and used precast moulds for cascabels. Verbruggen's horizontal boring machine was the first industrial size lathe installed in England.

Henry Maudslay, the later inventor of many improvements to the lathe, worked as an apprentice in Verbruggen's workshop in Woolwich.

The first guns made by the Verbruggens passed proof tests in April 1774. Cannons, mortars and howitzers were made at the foundry; the proof record was higher than in earlier years, and the foundry was able to satisfy the requirements of the British services.

Jan Verbruggen died in London on 27 October 1781 and was buried at the Dutch Church, Austin Friars on 2 November. His son Pieter continued as master founder at the Woolwich foundry.
