= Phoenician joint =

Wood joinery technique used in shipbuilding

Phoenician joints coagmenta punicana
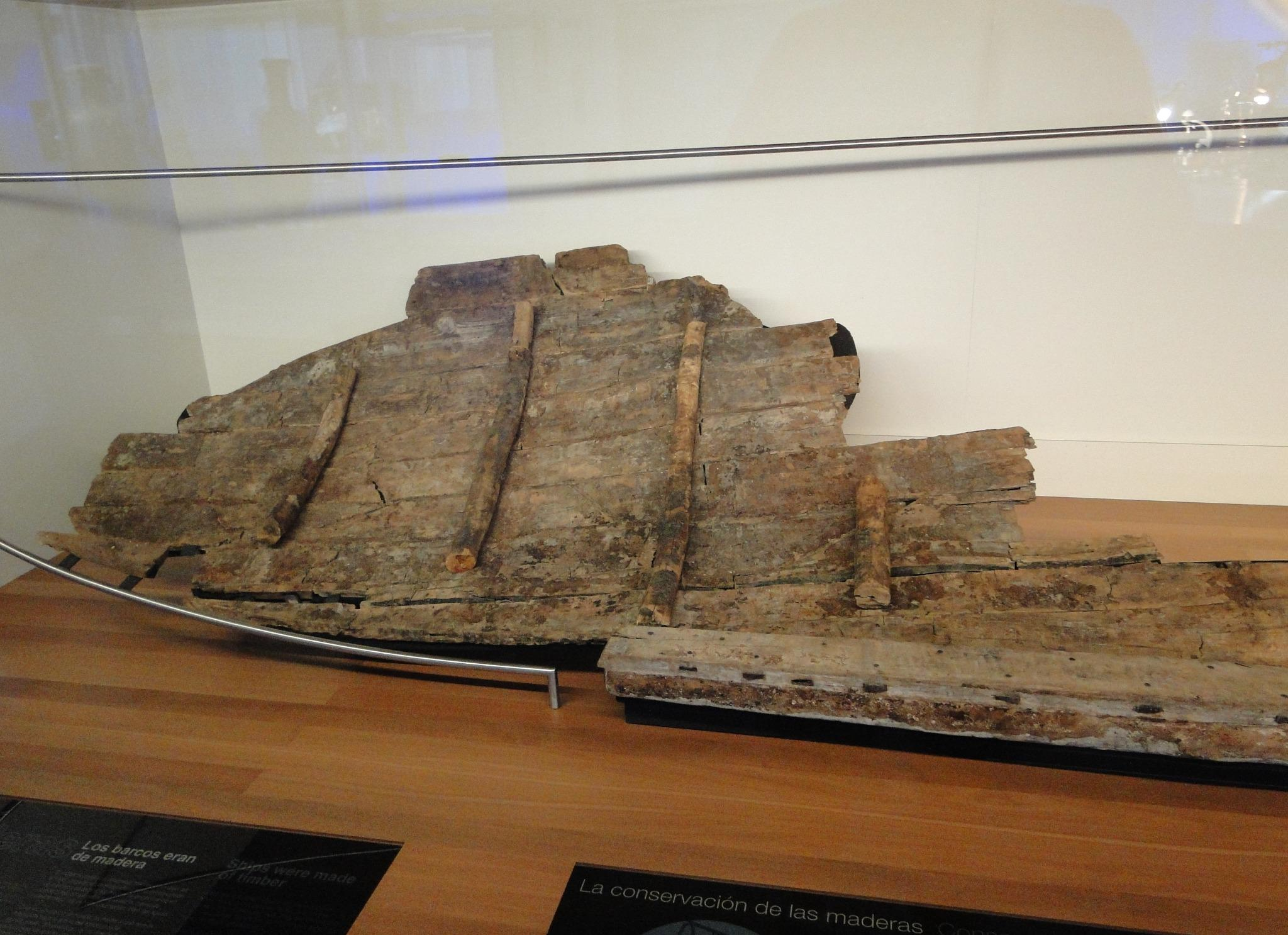
- Mortise and tenon joinery in the Mazarron 1 Phoenician shipwreck
- Industrial sector(s): Woodworking, shipbuilding
- Feedstock: Timber
- Product(s): Watercraft hulls secured with locked mortise and tenon joints
- Inventor: The Phoenicians

A Phoenician joint (Latin: coagmenta punicana) is a locked mortise and tenon wood joinery technique used in shipbuilding to fasten watercraft hulls. The locked (or pegged) mortise and tenon technique consists of cutting a mortise, or socket, into the edges of two planks and fastening them together with a rectangular wooden knob. The assembly is then locked in place by driving a dowel through one or more holes drilled through the mortise side wall and tenon.

The Phoenicians pioneered the use of locked mortise and tenon joints in nautical joinery to secure the underwater planking of seagoing ships. The use of pegged mortises and tenons in shipbuilding spread westward from the Levantine littoral. Examples of the use of Phoenician joints in the ancient Mediterranean include the Uluburun ship, dated c. 1320±50 BC, and the Cape Gelidonya ship dated to c. 1200 BC.

By the first millennium BC, Phoenician joints became a common edge-to-edge fastening method. Ancient Greek and Roman shipbuilders adopted the technique of Phoenician joinery. Roman writers credited the joinery technique to Phoenicians by calling it coagmenta punicana or Punicanis coamentis. The ancient Greek historian Polybius reported that the Romans copied the locked mortise and tenon technique from a Punic warship that ran aground in 264 BC. They exploited this technique to their advantage early in the First Punic War in 260 BC which allowed them to build a fleet of 100 quinqueremes within a period of two months.

== History ==
Model of Khufu's Solar barque with its deck removed to expose the hull. The ship's planks and frames are lashed together with halfah grass.

Phoenician joints postdate the sewn watercraft lacing joinery technique. Archaeological finds have revealed transitional watercraft integrating elements from both mortise and tenon, and other joinery techniques. Chinese Neolithic societies used the locked mortise and tenon method, but did not use a separate rectangular tenon nor edge-to-edge plank joining. The locked mortise and tenon method occurs as of c. 3000 BC in non-nautical Ancient Egyptian joinery, but not in hull-planking, which only featured unlocked mortises.

In the third and early second millennium BC, the Ancient Egyptians employed a similar technique, however, the mortise and tenon joints were not locked in place using pegs. To ensure ship hull stability, the Egyptians used their unlocked fastening technique together with other methods of wood fastening. An example of this technique is the Fourth Dynasty Khufu funerary ship (c. 2600 BC), an intact 43.6 meters (143 ft) long Lebanon cedar lashed-lug vessel, that was unearthed in the Giza pyramid complex. The barque's cedar planks were joined together using unlocked mortise and tenon, and two types of lashings between bordering strakes and, from sheer to sheer. The mixed use of unlocked mortise and tenon with wood lashing is also attested in later ancient Egyptian ships from Lisht (c. 1950 BC) and Dashur (c. 1859 BC). The use of pegged mortise and tenon shipbuilding in Egypt is not supported by material evidence before around 500 BC.

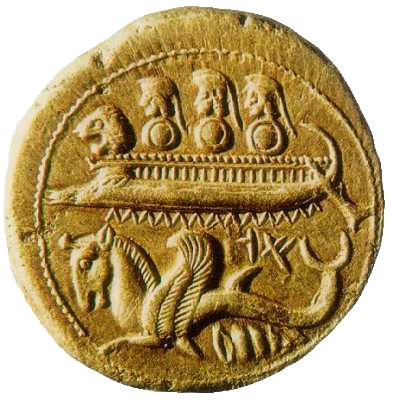
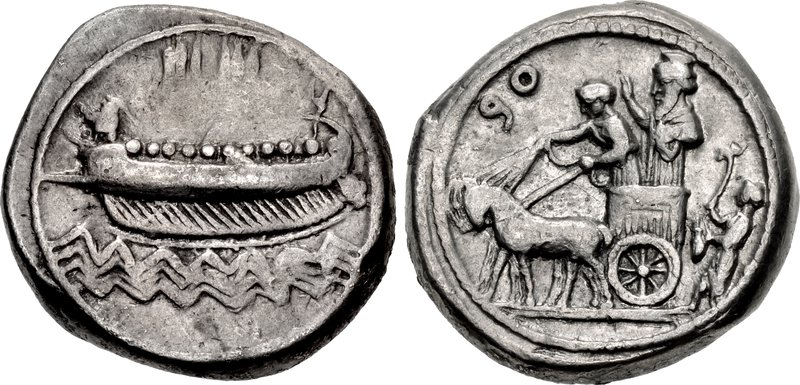
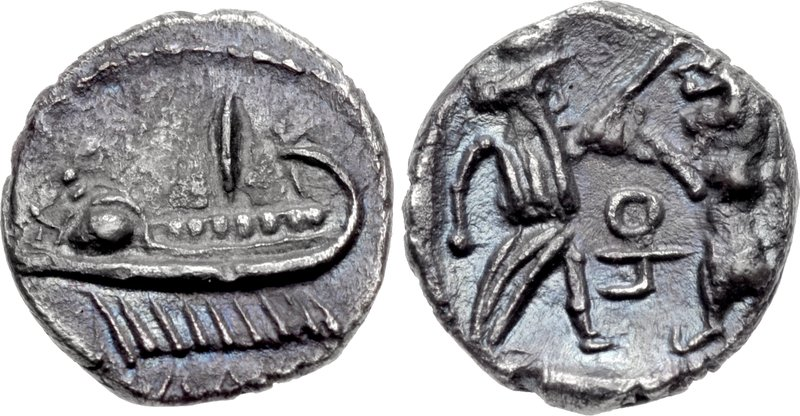
The Phoenicians were famed in antiquity for their shipbuilding skills. They often depicted ships and war galleys on their currency, the shekel.

The Phoenicians pioneered the use of locked mortise and tenon joints in nautical joinery to secure the underwater planking of seagoing ships. The use of pegged mortises and tenons in shipbuilding spread westward from the Levantine littoral. According to McGrail, this joinery method could have given rise to the Phoenicians' reputation for seafaring excellence. The hull of the Uluburun ship, an early Phoenician/Canaanite vessel dated c. 1320±50 BC, is the earliest evidence of pegged Phoenician joints used in Mediterranean shipbuilding. The ship's hull was built with Lebanese cedar, with oak tenons. (Note: Cedar is well documented in Bronze Age sources as the material of choice for shipbuilding. This preference is due to its light weight, its resistance to saltwater damage from prolonged periods of submersion, and because it did not shrink excessively.) Additional early evidence of Phoenician joint usage comes from another Canaanite shipwreck in Cape Gelidonya in Turkey dated c. 1200±50 BC. The Uluburun and Gelidonya ships allowed scholars to date back the Phoenicians' maritime activity to an earlier period when it was thought that Canaanite seafaring did not start before the first millennium BC, and that maritime trade in the Eastern Mediterranean was solely conducted by Mycenaeans.

By the first millennium BC, Phoenician joints became a common edge-to-edge fastening method in the ancient Mediterranean. Greek shipbuilders abruptly abandoned the laced wood technique and adopted the Phoenician joinery. Scholars posit that Greek shipbuilders acquired the mortise and tenon joinery technique from the Phoenicians. Phoenician influence on Greek shipbuilding technology resulted from contact between the two people during the Phoenicians' westward colonization. By the middle of the first millennium BC shipbuilders developed deeper understanding and expertise in the locked mortise and tenon joints as evidenced in the fourth century BC Kyrenia shipwreck and the third century BC wreckage of the Marsala Punic warship.

In 264 BC, the Romans seized a Phoenician penteres that ran aground. Polybius reports that the ship served as a model for the Romans' fleet ships; they realized the advantage of using Phoenician joints in shipbuilding, as the lumber used in edge-joined ship strakes does not have to be dried. Early in the First Punic War in 260 BC, the Phoenician joint technique allowed the Romans to build a fleet of 100 quinqueremes within a period of two months.

The technique is also seen in Vietnam. Excavation carried out in waterlogged burials in Dong Xa in Vietnam revealed the adoption of a variety of the locked mortise and tenon technique in the construction of a logboat. The boat dates back to the Dong Son culture in the late Vietnamese prehistory (500 BC to AD 200).

== Description ==
Mortise and tenon joints strengthened with dowels, as used in the construction of the hulls of triremes.

The locked (or pegged) mortise and tenon technique consists of cutting a mortise, or socket, into the faces of two planks to be fastened together. A piece of wood called a tenon, usually taking the form of a rectangle, is inserted into each mortise to join the two planks together. The assembly is locked by driving a peg (or dowel pin or treenail) through one or more holes drilled through the mortise side wall and tenon. This technique is known as Phoenician joint when applied to shipbuilding.

== Etymology ==
The origin of the term Phoenician joinery comes from the Latin, since Roman writers credited the joinery technique to Phoenicians by calling it coagmenta punicana or Punicanis coamentis. The Latin term is known through the extant writings such as that of Cato the Elder. In his treatise on agriculture, De agri cultura, (Note: In Latin: "Orbem olearium latum P. IIII Punicanis coagmentis facito, crassum digitos VI facito, subscudes iligneas adindito. Eas ubi confixeris, clavis corneis occludito. In eum orbem tris catenas indito. Eas catenas cum orbi clavis ferreis corrigito. Orbem ex ulmo aut ex corylo facito: si utrumque habebis, alternas indito." "Make the oil press disk 4 ft wide, with Phoenician joints, 6 digits thick, add oaken tenons. When these have been fitted in their places, secure them with dowels of dogwood. Fit three battens to the disk; make the battens and the disk straight together by means of iron nails. Make the disk of elm or hazel; if you have both, lay them alternately.") Cato describes the construction of a wooden disk used in oil presses using locked mortise and tenon joinery; he refers to the technique as Punicanis coamentis, thereby crediting Rome's enemies.

Punicanis means Punic and derives from the Latin poenus and punicus, which were used mostly to refer to the Carthaginians and other western Phoenicians. These terms derived from the Ancient Greek word Φοῖνιξ ("Phoinix"), plural form Φοίνικες ("Phoinikes"), an exonym used indiscriminately to refer to both western and eastern Phoenicians.

Coamentis translates to the English "coagment" meaning to join together or unite.

== See also ==
- Lashed-lug boat – Boat construction method from Maritime Southeast Asia
- Phoenician expedition, Naval expedition commissioned by Necho I– Egyptian pharaoh
- Phoenician Ship Expedition – Recreation of a 6th-century BC Phoenician voyage conceived by Philip Beale
- Sewn boat – Type of wooden boat
- Ship Sarcophagus – Roman-era stone coffin found in modern-day Lebanon
