= National Museum of Subaquatic Archaeology =

Archaeology museum in Cartagena, Spain

Coordinates: 37.5977°N 0.9808°W

- Museo Nacional de Arqueología Subacuática
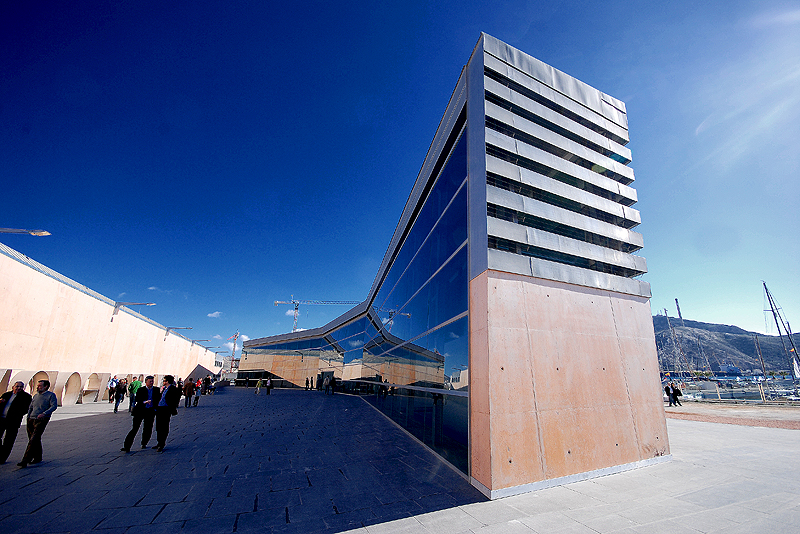
- Former name: Museo Nacional de Investigaciones Arqueológicas Submarinas; Museo Nacional de Arqueología Marítima
- Established: 1980
- Location: Cartagena (Murcia), Spain
- Type: Archaeology museum
- Website: https://museoarqua.mcu.es

The National Museum of Subaquatic Archaeology (Spanish: Museo Nacional de Arqueología Subacuática - ARQVA) is an underwater archaeology museum in Cartagena in Murcia, Spain. It owns a large collection of pieces recovered from shipwrecks that begins with the Phoenician shipwrecks of Mazarrón and goes on into the 19th century. It is part of the National Museums of Spain and it is attached to the Ministry of Culture.

On December 2, 2012, the 14.5 tons cargo of gold and silver coins recovered from the wreck of the frigate Nuestra Señora de las Mercedes was deposited in the museum for cataloging, study and permanent display.
