= Andrew Schalch =

Swiss gun-founder (1692–1776)

Andrew Schalch (1692 – 5 February 1776), born in Switzerland, was the first gun-founder at the Royal Arsenal in Woolwich, London.

== Life ==
Schalch was born in Schaffhausen, Switzerland, in 1692. After being employed in the cannon foundry at Douai he came to England, and in August 1716 he was engaged to build the furnaces and provide the utensils for the new brass foundry at the Royal Arsenal, Woolwich, then called the Warren.

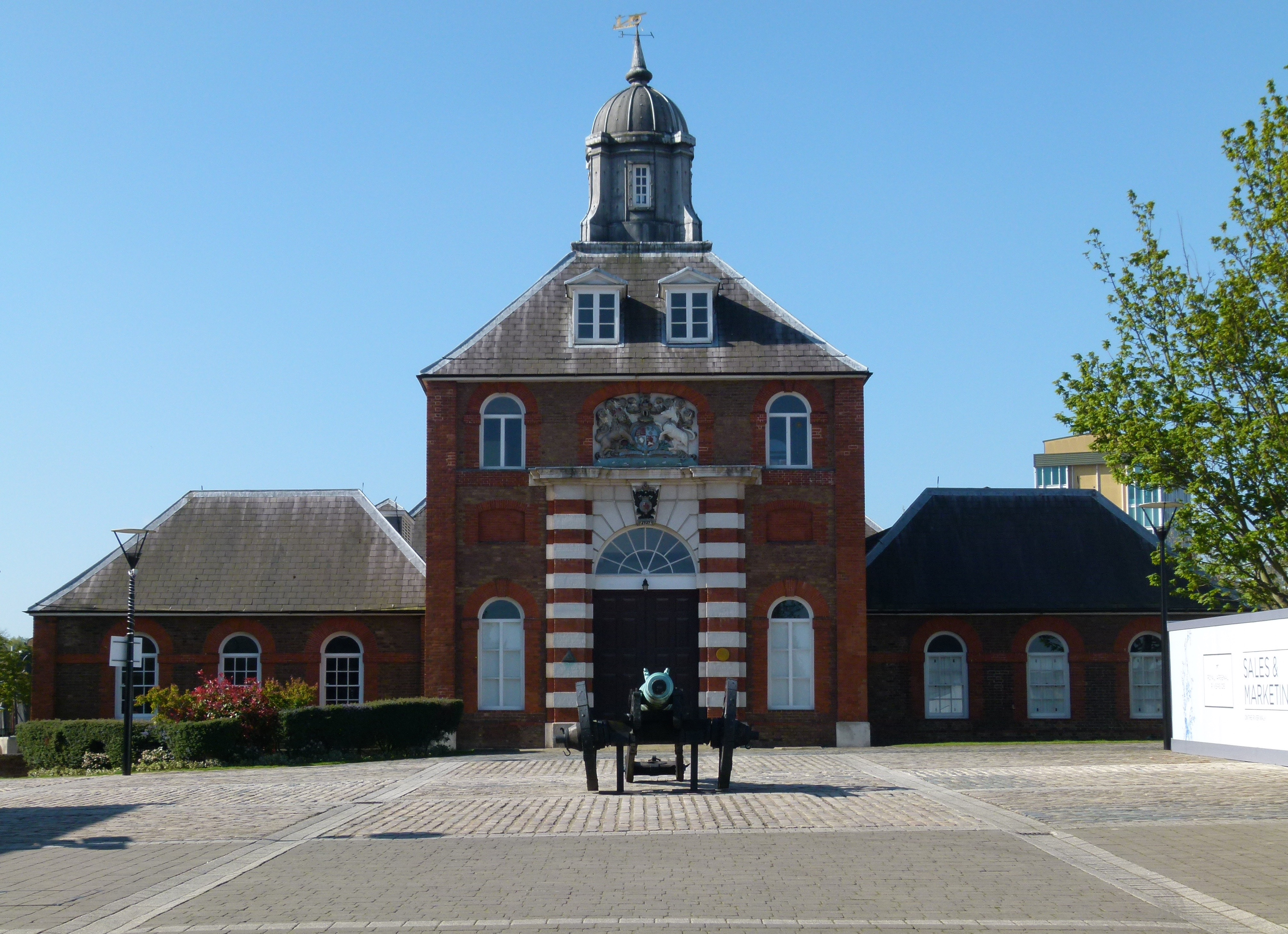
Royal Brass Foundry at Woolwich, built 1716–1717

Up to that time it had been used as a depot for stores, and cannon had been proved there, but not manufactured. The only place for casting brass ordnance in England was Matthew Bagley's foundry in Moorfields. A number of people assembled there on 10 May 1716 to see some captured French guns melted down and recast; an explosion occurred in which seventeen people, including Matthew Bagley, were killed and others injured. It was in consequence of this accident that the Board of Ordnance decided on a government foundry.

There is a story that Schalch, a young and unknown man, predicted this explosion, having noticed the dampness of the moulds; that after it had taken place he was advertised for, and that the selection of a site for the new foundry was left to him. He has therefore been reckoned the father of the Arsenal. However, the story is unauthenticated.

On the contrary, an advertisement has been found (10 July 1716) inviting competent men to offer themselves, after the site had been chosen and the building begun. A good report of Schalch's capacity having been obtained through the British minister at Brussels, his appointment to Woolwich was confirmed in October. A warrant of the Duke of Marlborough as Master-General of the Ordnance formally nominated Schalch master-founder of His Majesty's brass foundry on 16 May 1718.

He cast cannons, mortars, howitzers and machine parts. From the 1740s relations between Schalch and the Board deteriorated, because of delays and dissatisfaction with the quality of the guns. Since guns were required for the Seven Years' War (from 1754), Schalch was not dismissed. The Board continued to criticise Schalch's slowness during the 1760s. Government demands were met by two Southwark brassfounders, William Bowen and Richard Gilpin.

Schalch retired in January 1770, after the Board began to employ Pieter and Jan Verbruggen. He died at the age of eighty-four, and was buried in Woolwich churchyard. The Gentleman's Magazine records his death as Andrew Schutch (sic), esq., at Greenwich on 5 February 1776.
