= Spanish frigate Nuestra Señora de las Mercedes =

Spanish Navy frigate

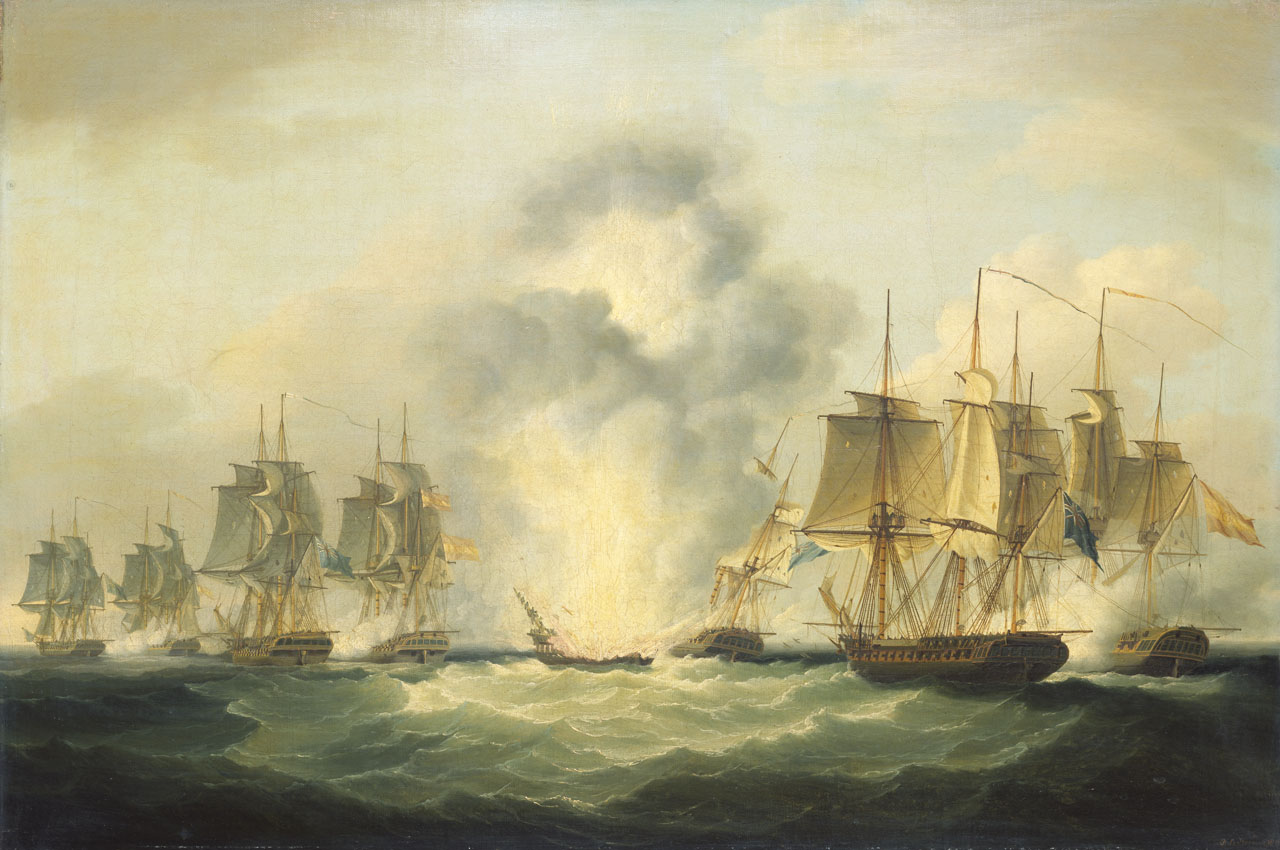
- The sinking of Nuestra Señora de las Mercedes

History

Spain
- Name: Nuestra Señora de las Mercedes
- Launched: Havana, Cuba, 1786
- Fate: Sunk on 5 October 1804
- Notes: Thought to be the wreck discovered by Odyssey Marine Exploration, code named "Black Swan"

General characteristics
- Armament: 36 guns

Nuestra Señora de las Mercedes (Our Lady of Mercy in English, a title of the Virgin Mary) was a Spanish Navy frigate which was sunk by the British off the south coast of Portugal on 5 October 1804 during the Battle of Cape Santa Maria.

== Loss ==
At the time of the naval action Spain and England were at peace with each other. The Spanish frigate was part of a small flotilla sailing from Montevideo (Uruguay) to Cadiz (Andalusia, Spain), transporting silver, gold, vicuña, cinnamon, and quinoa. The other ships in the flotilla were Medea, Santa Clara, and Fama.

The flotilla was intercepted by a Royal Navy task force, commanded by Graham Moore aboard HMS Indefatigable, and ordered to change course and proceed to a British port for inspection. The Spanish commanding officer, brigadier José de Bustamante y Guerra (1759–1825) objected that the two nations were at peace, declared that they would not comply with the order, and ordered battle quarters, despite being outgunned and outnumbered. A single shot from HMS Amphion, commanded by Samuel Sutton, hit the ship's magazine, causing an explosion that sank the ship.

250 Spanish crewmen were lost, and 51 survivors were rescued from the sea and taken as prisoner. The other three vessels were interned in Britain. Her wreck has been compared with that of USS Arizona at Pearl Harbor, due to the loss of life and the battle leading to a declaration of war.

== Salvage ==
In 2007 the company Odyssey Marine Exploration reported having found, at an undisclosed location, a very rich shipwreck code-named "Black Swan". Odyssey recovered almost 500,000 silver and gold coins from the wreck, and transported them to the United States. Spanish researchers quickly identified the ship found by Odyssey with Mercedes and the Spanish government started a legal battle to halt what they considered was an act of illegal looting.

The approximate location of Mercedes off Cape Santa Maria on the south coast of Iberia

Peru attempted to claim the treasure as being originally plundered by the Spanish. However, a court case decided that the Spanish government was the rightful successor of interest because at the time of the wreck, Peru was considered a Spanish colony and not a separate legal entity, therefore it had no legal standing to be entitled to the proceeds of the lawsuit.

A U.S. federal court and a panel from the United States Court of Appeals for the Eleventh Circuit upheld the Spanish claim to the contents of the ship; Spain took control of the treasure in February 2012. A very small number of coins and effects recovered from the ship were deposited in Gibraltar, because they showed clear signs consistent with an internal explosion on the ship and thus confirmed Spanish claims to the wreck being that of Nuestra Señora de las Mercedes. They were not returned to Spain until 2013, when a court finally ordered Odyssey Marine to return the missing pieces.

On 2 December 2012 the 14.5 tons cargo of gold and silver coins recovered from the wreck was deposited in the National Museum of Subaquatic Archaeology in Cartagena (Murcia) for cataloging, study and permanent display.

== Exhibition ==
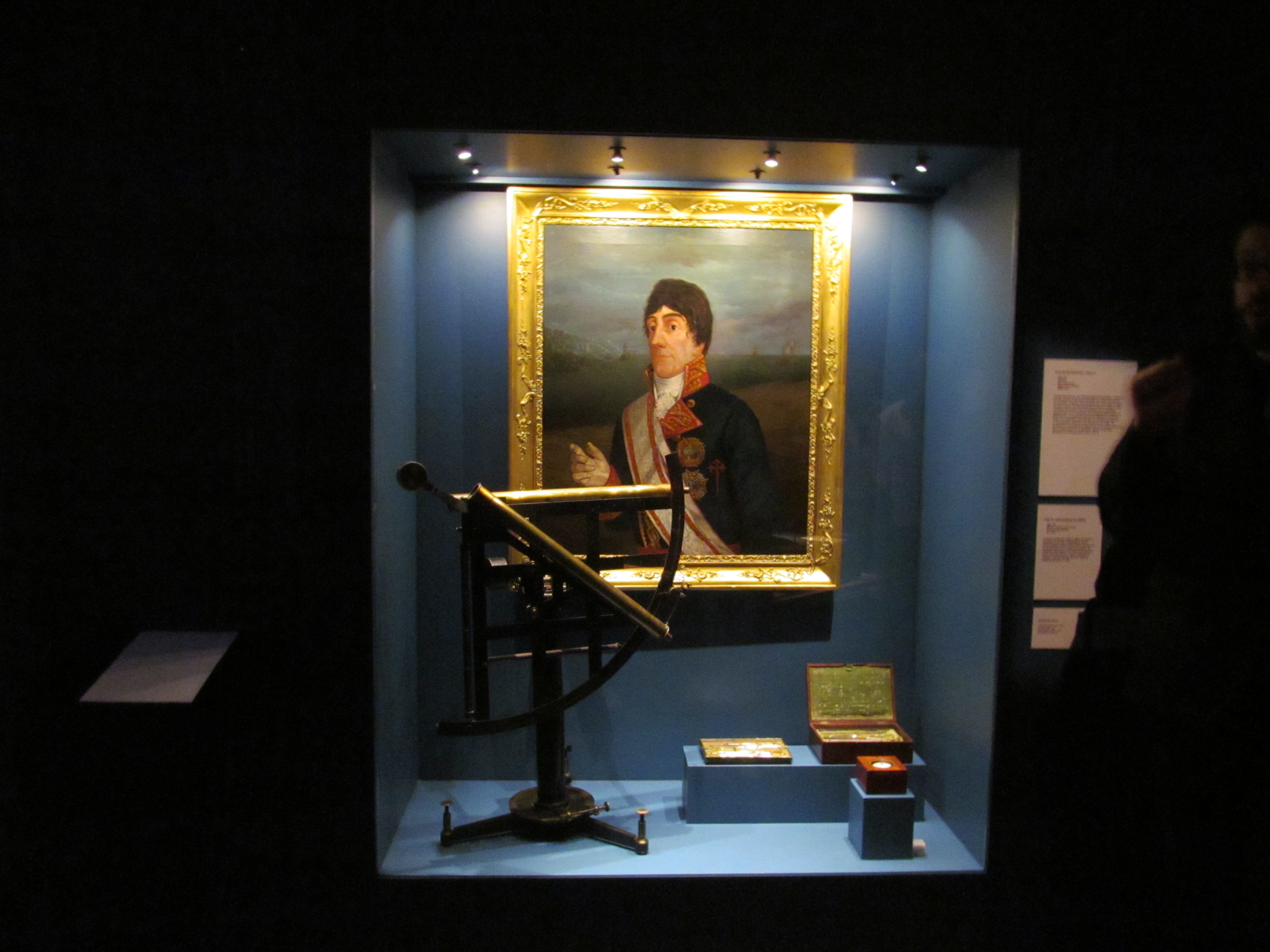
José de Bustamante y Guerra was in command of a fleet of four frigates, Nuestra Señora de las Mercedes, La Clara, La Medea and La Fama, when they were intercepted by an English squadron on 5 October 1804

Spanish Naval Museum along with National Archaeological Museum of Spain showed the recovered treasure in the exhibition "The last trip of the frigate Mercedes. A recovered cultural treasure" («El último viaje de la fragata Mercedes. Un tesoro cultural recuperado») from June to December 2014.

In 2015 the Spanish government commanded an archaeological expedition to study the shipwreck, which proved that Odyssey had damaged the remnants of the ship when extracting coins.

== See also ==
- Cabo de Santa Maria (Faro)
- List of Spanish sail frigates
- Black Swan Project

== Bibliography ==
- Winfield, Rif; Tredrea, John M; García-Torralba Pérez, Enrique & Blasco Felip, Manuel (2023). Spanish Warships in the Age of Sail 1700—1860: Design, Construction, Careers and Fates. Seaforth Publishing. ISBN 978-1-5267-9078-1.
