= Odyssey Marine Exploration =

Deep-ocean company in the US

Odyssey Marine Exploration, Inc.
- Type: Public
- Traded as: Nasdaq: OMEX
- Industry: Deep-sea exploration
- Founded: 1994; 32 years ago
- Founders: John Morris; Greg Stemm
- Headquarters: Tampa, Florida, United States
- Key people: Mark Gordon (CEO and Chairman); John Longley (president)
- Revenue: ▲US$ 3.1million (FY 2019)
- Website: www.odysseymarine.com

Odyssey Marine Exploration, Inc. is an American company engaged in deep-ocean exploration with a focus on the exploration, development and extraction of subsea mineral resources. Starting out as a shipwreck pioneer, Odyssey has discovered some of the most famous deep-ocean shipwrecks in history, including Ancona, Gairsoppa, Nuestra Señora de las Mercedes, Republic, and HMS Victory. Its work has been featured on the Discovery Channel, PBS and National Geographic.

== Mineral exploration ==
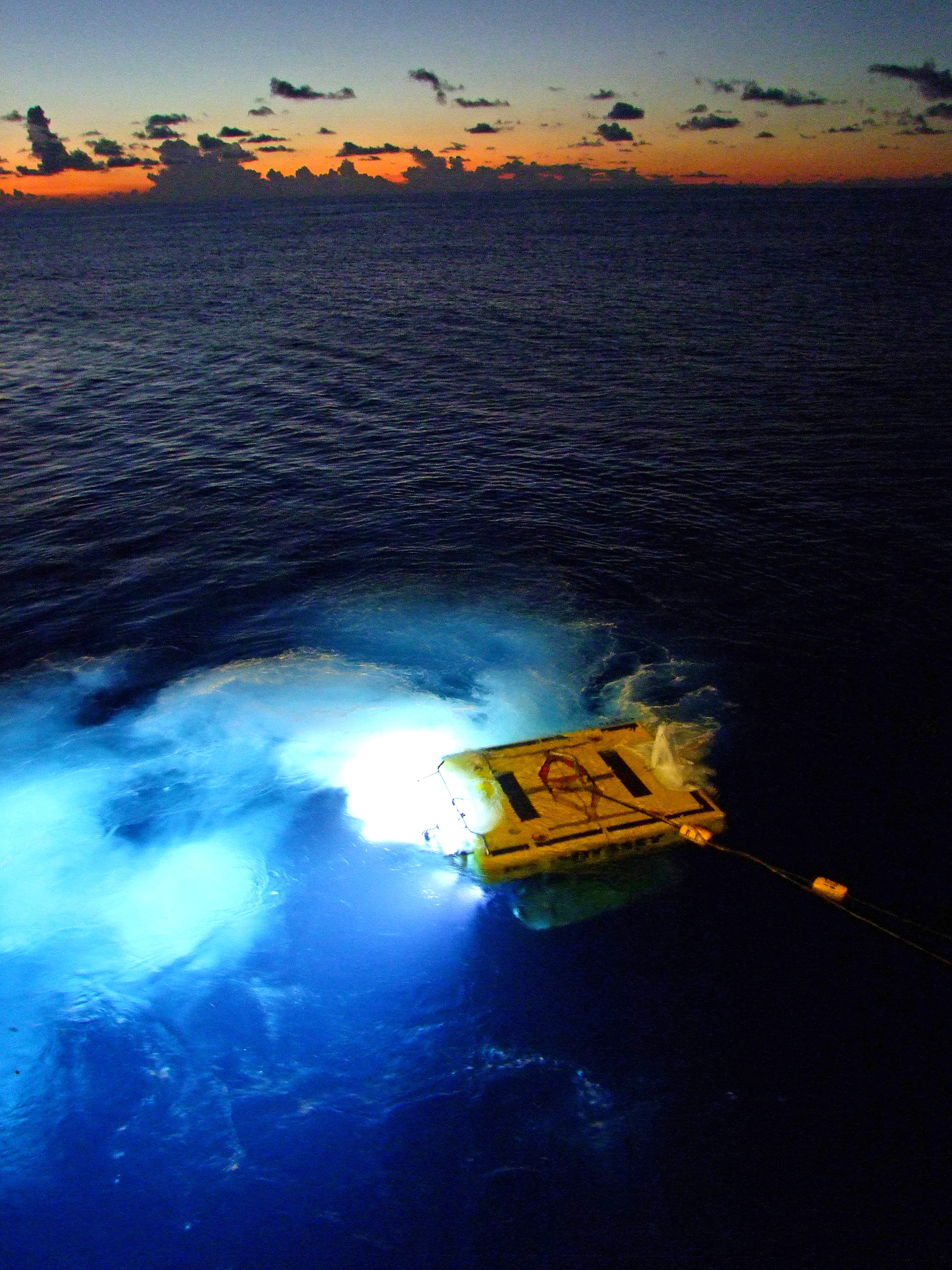
Odyssey's ROV is deployed in the deep ocean to visit a mineral resource.

In 2009, Odyssey announced it acquired a minority interest in SMM Project LLC., a company with licenses to explore in four different areas in the South Pacific. This marked the beginning of Odyssey’s transition into a mineral exploration company.

Odyssey later executed a charter agreement with Chatham Rock Phosphate to undertake site investigation work for its offshore permit area on the Chatham Rise. Odyssey also owns a minority ownership stake in Neptune Minerals, a company focused on discovering and commercializing high-value mineral deposits from the ocean floor.

In March 2013, Odyssey disclosed an ownership interest in Oceanica Resources, S. de R.L., and Exploraciones Oceanicas, S. de R.L. de C.V. (“ExO”), a subsidiary of Oceanica. ExO conducts mineral exploration and controls exclusive permits in an area in Mexican waters that contains a large amount of phosphate mineralized material. According to its latest financial report, Odyssey Marine Exploration controls ExO through the company's majority ownership stake in Oceanica. Odyssey performed all of the exploration to find and validate the mineralized phosphate deposit and is managing the environmental studies, including an NI 43-101 report in 2014, and environmental permit application process with ExO. The current resource assessment defines the deposit as containing 588.3 million tonnes of phosphate ore with an average in situ P_{2}O_{5} of 18.1%, overburden of 1.14 meters and ore thickness of 2.80 meters. This makes it one of the largest phosphate deposits to be discovered in the world.

In July 2019, Odyssey acquired a nearly 80% ownership interest in Bismarck Mining Corporation, a company that owns an exploration license for 320 square kilometers containing at least five exploration targets in two different mineralization types (seamount-related epithermal and modern placer gold). The license area is adjacent to Lihir Island in Papua New Guinea where one of the world’s largest known terrestrial gold deposits is currently being mined and processed by Newcrest.

In 2020, Odyssey announced it is invested in CIC and provides marine services to the project. The company holds a 15% stake in CIC. On February 23, 2022, CIC was awarded a five-year exploration license by the Cook Islands’ Seabed Mineral Authority (SBMA). Environmental research expedition details are being finalized and operations are expected to begin within the second quarter of 2022.

On June 4, 2023, Odyssey also invested in Ocean Minerals LLC (OML). Moana Minerals Limited, a wholly owned subsidiary of OML, holds a five-year exploration license from the Cook Islands Seabed Minerals Authority (SBMA) granted in 2022 to explore polymetallic nodules within the Cook Islands’ Exclusive Economic Zone (EEZ).

According to the company’s website, they have various additional projects in development for other mineral deposits in various jurisdictions around the world.

== History ==
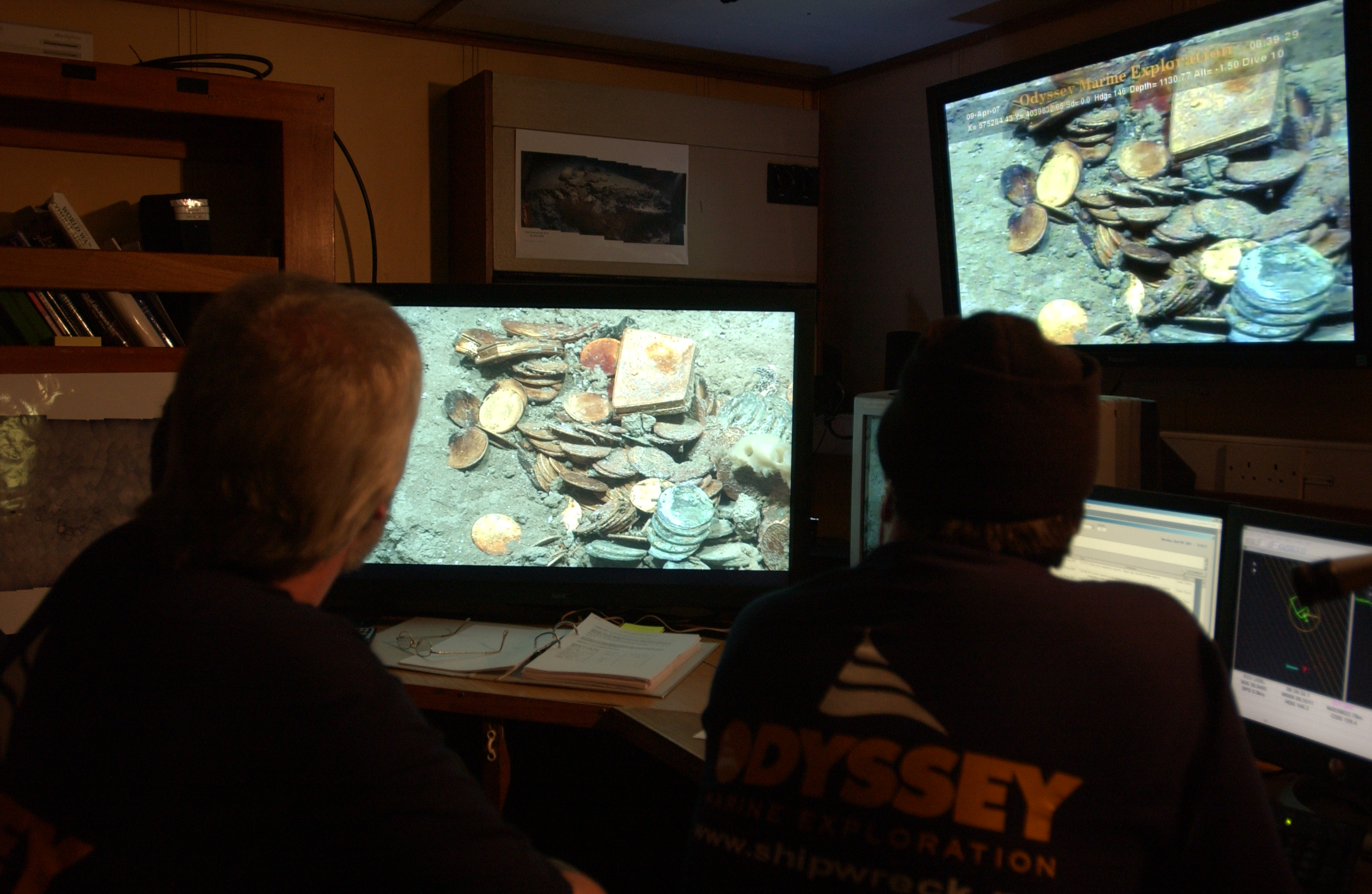
Gregory Stemm, co-founder of Odyssey Marine Exploration, along with an archaeologist exploring a shipwreck site

Odyssey was founded in 1994 by shipwreck exploration pioneers Greg Stemm and John Morris.

Between 1998 and 2001, Odyssey Marine Exploration searched for HMS Sussex and stated that it believed it had located the shipwreck off Gibraltar at a depth of 821 metres. The English ship sank in a storm in 1694 during the War of the Grand Alliance as it was transporting 10 tons of gold coins to buy the allegiance of the Duke of Savoy, Victor Amadeus II, against France.

Odyssey’s first big treasure discovery came in 2003 when they found the Civil War-Era shipwreck of Republic. An extensive archaeological excavation was conducted that included a pre-disturbance survey and around 2,500 underwater high-resolution images captured and used to create a photomosaic of the entire site. Over 51,000 gold and silver coins were recovered from the site as well as 14,000 artifacts. Six archaeological reports were written about the shipwreck project and two books were published, Lost Gold of the Republic and Bottles from the Deep. PBS and National Geographic also aired documentaries on the discovery.

The company has also discovered several less famous shipwrecks of archaeological importance including one code-named “Blue China” a 19th Century trading vessel found in 2005 during the company’s search for the Republic. When Odyssey returned to the site in 2005, an extensive amount of post-wreck destruction caused by modern fishing trawl nets dragged over the site was noted. The company moved forward with creating a photomosaic and recovering the remaining artifacts before further destruction occurred.

In December 2005, Odyssey began an archaeological investigation of the site believed to be HMS Sussex. The company adhered to the project plan submitted and accepted by the Sussex Archaeological Executive, a committee of archaeological consultants approved by the UK Government. As of 2009, Odyssey had completed Phase 1A (the non-disturbance survey) and a substantial portion of Phase 1B (trial excavation of the site believed to be HMS Sussex) to the satisfaction of the UK Government.

In early June 2006, Odyssey provided clarification to Spain's Ministry of Foreign Affairs through the offices of the embassy of the United Kingdom and awaited final comments on the plan before resuming operations on the shipwreck believed to be that of the Sussex. In March 2007, Andalusia gave its assent for the excavation to start with the condition that Spanish archaeologists take part in order to ascertain that the shipwreck to be excavated was indeed the Sussex and not a Spanish vessel. While waiting for Andalusia to appoint an archaeologist to participate in the Sussex expedition, the company began operations on the "Black Swan" excavation. In 2009, Odyssey Marine Exploration published an archaeological report on the Sussex project and the groundbreaking work they had completed to date.

== "Black Swan" controversy ==
In May 2007, the company announced the recovery of 17 tons of mainly silver and some gold coins from a site in an undisclosed location in international waters, which the company code-named the "Black Swan". Some believed that the shipwreck could be the Spanish frigate Nuestra Señora de las Mercedes, which exploded and sank in the action of 5 October 1804, but no definitive shipwreck hull or unique cargo was discovered to conclusively prove the theory.

Following the discovery, Odyssey brought the coins and artifacts recovered into the jurisdiction of the United States Federal Court by filing an admiralty arrest pursuant to admiralty law. At that time, the Spanish government claimed that they believed the site was in Spanish territorial waters. The Spanish Government has since conceded that claim and sought to claim the discovered treasure based on their belief that the Nuestra Señora de las Mercedes should be afforded sovereign immunity.

On July 12, 2007, the Civil Guard seized the Odyssey Marine Exploration research vessel Ocean Alert 3.5 nautical miles (6 km) off the European coast. The Spanish Civil Guard claims to be responsible for customs control and European Union borders in this region, under the EU Schengen Agreement. This, however, is disputed by the Government of Gibraltar and the UK Government who claim that the ship was detained in international waters near Gibraltar and that Spain therefore had no legal authority to board the vessel without the express consent of the flag state of the ship—in this case, Panama. The Gibraltar Government stated that although this was a matter for the Government of Panama, they are "concerned that international shipping using Gibraltar port should be interfered with in this way in international waters." The ship was ordered to sail to the Spanish port of Algeciras to undergo a search and inspection. Issues include the value and cultural significance of the shipwreck and the disputed status of Gibraltar between the UK and Spain. Panama is also involved because Odyssey's vessel is flagged there. In 2010, Odyssey's Captain Sterling Vorus was cleared of all charges by a court in Algeciras, Spain, relating to the blockade and boarding of the Odyssey Explorer. The Spanish court ruled that Spanish officials did not have proper authorization to board or search Odyssey's ship in 2007.

In January 2011, Odyssey Marine claimed that the language used in recently leaked diplomatic cables showed that the US State Department had been involved with negotiations to assist the Spanish government in receiving the treasure in exchange for the return of allegedly stolen artwork to a US private citizen. The US State Department declined comment while Spain denied Odyssey Marine's claim. The Department of State's Office of Inspector General subsequently investigated the charges in response to a request by Representative Kathy Castor of Florida. In March 2011, it determined that it could find no evidence of a connection between the Black Swan case and the negotiations for the return of the artwork in question (a Pissarro painting).

A U.S. federal judge awarded the treasure to Spain in December 2009, on the ground that the ship remained the property of Spain, but Odyssey appealed the ruling. Finally, after a five-year legal battle, in February 2012 the U.S. Supreme Court ordered Odyssey Marine to relinquish the treasure to Spanish authorities. Spain's culture minister indicated the treasure would be divided among several national museums. In September 2013, a U.S. district judge further ruled that Odyssey had acted in "bad faith" and engaged in "abusive litigation", should have recognized Spain's right, and should thus reimburse $1 million in Spain's attorneys fees. Odyssey then issued a statement recognizing that this case was unusual since it was the first time a court has made an order without accepting jurisdiction but that the court ruling has clarified the applicable law, which Odyssey is committed to respecting.

== Gairsoppa discovery and beyond ==
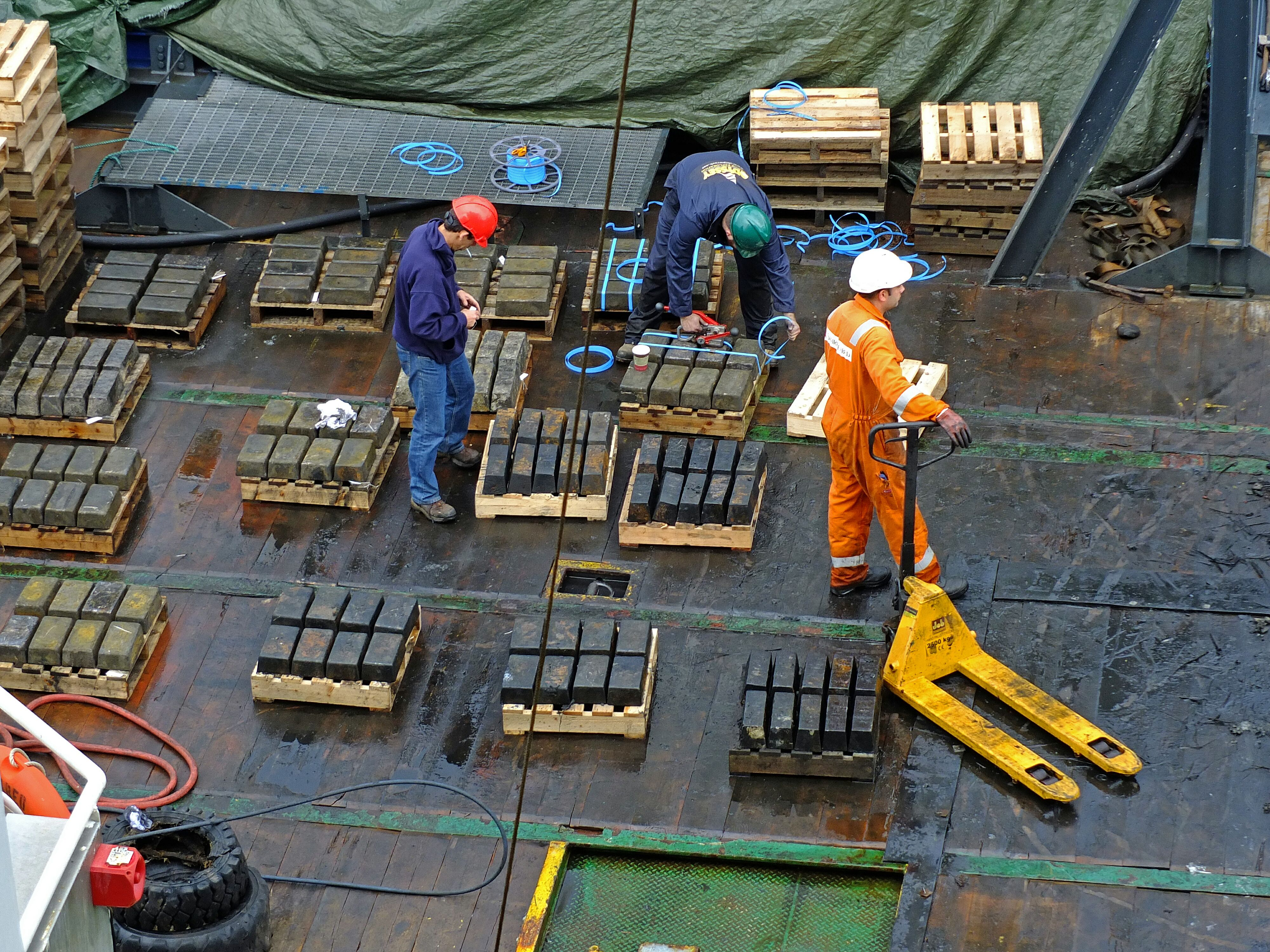
The Odyssey crew inspects some of the silver recovered from the Gairsoppa shipwreck site.

In 2009, Odyssey Marine Exploration's searches were the subject of the Discovery Channel program, Treasure Quest. The program revealed that Odyssey discovered Admiral Balchin’s long-lost HMS Victory shipwreck that had eluded explorers for 265 years.

In 2011, Odyssey announced it discovered the shipwreck site of Gairsoppa, a steel-hulled British cargo steamship that was in the service of the United Kingdom Ministry of War Transport and sunk by a German U-boat on February 16, 1941, approximately 300 miles southwest of Galway, Ireland. Odyssey discovered the site at a depth of 4700 meters with the recovery of 61 tons of silver. Through a two year expedition, they recovered over 110 tons of silver ingots. The expedition was the subject of a three part Discovery Channel docuseries called Silver Rush. In addition to silver, 717 letters, the largest collection of mail found on any shipwreck worldwide, was recovered and archaeologically conserved from the shipwreck and are now on display at the Postal Museum in the UK.

In 2014, Odyssey Marine Exploration was selected to salvage gold from the 1857 shipwreck of Central America. The expedition led to the recovery of more than 15,500 gold and silver coins, 45 gold bars and hundreds of other gold nuggets, gold dust, jewelry and artifacts.

In December 2015, Odyssey announced the sale of part of its assets to a company called Monaco Financial for $21 million. This capital allowed the company to reimburse a $11.7 million bank debt. Sold assets included the company's headquarters building in Florida, 50% of underwater mining business Neptune Minerals, and a profit-sharing agreement on future shipwreck salvages. CEO Mark Gordon also stated that the company would refocus on underwater mining, while shipwreck exploration would remain "part of the mix".

Artifacts recovered by Odyssey Marine Exploration are displayed in venues across the world, including a Virtual Museum, which is free to the public. The SHIPWRECKED Treasure Museum in Branson, MO, is home to over 500 artifacts recovered by Odyssey from different shipwrecks. Pirates Treasure Museum in St Thomas, USVI, also houses many of the artifacts recovered by Odyssey.
