= List of terrorist incidents in London =

This is a list of incidents in London that have been labelled as "terrorism". It includes various bomb attacks and other politically driven violent incidents.

== Irish republican attacks ==
=== Fenian attacks during the Fenian Dynamite Campaign 1867–1885 ===
1867

- 13 December 1867: "Clerkenwell Outrage": A bomb planted by Fenians at New Prison in Clerkenwell exploded, killing twelve passers-by.

1881

- 15 March 1881: A Fenian bomb was found and defused in the Mansion House, London.

1882

- 12 May 1882: A bomb exploded at the Mansion House, London.

1883

- 15 March 1883: Bombs exploded at government buildings at Whitehall, within Scotland Yard itself, and at the offices of The Times newspaper. There were no injuries.
- 30 October 1883: Two bombs exploded in the London Underground, at Paddington (Praed Street) station (injuring 70 people) and Westminster Bridge station.

1884

- 25 February 1884: A bomb exploded in the left-luggage room of Victoria station, London. The building was empty at the time and no-one was injured. Other bombs were defused at Charing Cross station, Ludgate Hill station and Paddington station.
- 30 May 1884: Three bombs exploded in London: at the headquarters of the Criminal Investigation Department (CID) and the Metropolitan Police Service's Special Irish Branch; in the basement of the Carlton Club, a gentlemen's club for members of the Conservative Party; and outside the home of Conservative MP Sir Watkin Williams-Wynn. Ten people were injured. A fourth bomb was planted at the foot of Nelson's Column but failed to explode.
- 13 December 1884: Three IRB members, who were planting a bomb on London Bridge, were killed when their bomb prematurely exploded. One of the men was William Mackey Lomasney.

1885

- 2 January 1885: A bomb exploded at Gower Street station, London.
- 20 January 1885: A bomb exploded on a Metropolitan line train at Gower Street (now Euston Square) tube station. No injuries were reported, although some passengers received minor cuts from broken glass.
- 24 January 1885: Bombs exploded at a number of locations in central London, including the House of Commons chamber, in Westminster Hall, in the Banqueting Room of the Tower of London and London Bridge. PCs Thomas Cox and William Cole and four civilians were injured (with both PCs awarded the Albert Medal). Two men were sentenced to penal servitude for life as a result.

=== Republican attacks during the Sabotage Campaign ===
On 16 January 1939, the Irish Republican Army (IRA) launched a campaign of bombing and sabotage against the civil, economic, and military infrastructure of Britain. It was known as the S-Plan or Sabotage Campaign. During the campaign, the IRA carried out almost 300 attacks and acts of sabotage in Britain, killing seven people and injuring 96. It petered out in early 1940.

==== 1939 ====
- 16 January 1939: a bomb exploded outside the control room of a large power station. It created a large crater in the forecourt of the building. There were no casualties and the control station was reportedly undamaged. A second explosion damaged an overhead cable running from Grand Union Canal to Willesden Power Station.
- 17 January 1939: A bomb exploded at Williams & Deacons Bank, damaging gas mains.
- 4 February 1939: Two bombs exploded in the London Underground – one at Tottenham Court Road station and one at Leicester Square station. They were timed suitcase bombs stored in the left-luggage rooms overnight. There were no deaths, although two people were wounded and severe damage was done to the stations.
- 9 February 1939: Two bombs exploded at King's Cross station.
- 2 March 1939: A bomb exploded on an aqueduct for the Grand Union Canal near Stonebridge Park.
- 23 March 1939: Five bombs exploded at different times during the day. Targets included telephone and gas installations, and the offices of the News Chronicle in Fleet Street.
- 29 March 1939: Two bombs exploded on Hammersmith Bridge.
- 31 March 1939: Seven bombs exploded in different parts of the city.
- 13 April 1939: Six bombs exploded in London and Birmingham. These had the appearance of being no more than trial explosions as all occurred in public lavatories.
- 5 May 1939: Two bombs exploded.
- 9 June 1939: Bombs exploded in thirty post offices and postboxes in London, Birmingham and Manchester.
- 24 June 1939: Several bombs exploded before or after a republican demonstration (under police protection) demanding the release of IRA volunteers.
- 24 June 1939: Bombs exploded at the London branches of the Midland Bank, Westminster Bank and Lloyds Bank.
- 26 July 1939: Two bombs exploded in the London Underground – one in the left-luggage area of King's Cross station and one in the left-luggage area of Victoria Station. In the King's Cross attack, one man was killed and two wounded. In the Victoria Station attack five were wounded.

==== 1940 ====
- 6 February 1940: Two bombs exploded in mailbags at Euston Station.
- 23 February 1940: Two bombs exploded in the West End. The devices had been placed in litter bins. More than 20 people were wounded.
- 6 March 1940: A bomb was set off at Park Lane Bank and in King's Inn Road in London.
- 17 March 1940: There was an explosion near Paddington Town Hall.
- 18 March 1940: Bomb explodes on a rubbish dump in London. No injuries.

=== Republican attacks during the Troubles ===
During the Troubles, the Provisional Irish Republican Army (IRA) and other republican groups were responsible for nearly 500 incidents in England, most of them in London. During the thirty-year campaign, 50 people were killed in London. This includes 28 civilians, 15 soldiers and 5 police officers. Two IRA members were also killed. In many cases telephoned warnings were given about bombs due to explode, identified as genuine by the use of a code word. In some cases the warning gave the wrong location, or did not give enough time to evacuate the area. Hoax calls, intended to cause disruption, were often made.

==== 1970–1979 ====
1973

- 8 March 1973: The Provisional Irish Republican Army conducted its first operation in England, planting four car bombs in London. Two of the car bombs were defused: a fertilizer bomb in a car outside the Post Office in Broadway and the BBC's armed forces radio studio in Dean Stanley Street. However, the other two exploded, one near the Old Bailey (1973 Old Bailey bombing) and the other at Ministry of Agriculture off Whitehall. Ten members of the IRA unit, including Gerry Kelly, Roy Walsh, Dolours Price and Marian Price, were arrested at Heathrow Airport trying to leave the country.
- 23 August 1973: A bomb was found in an abandoned bag in Baker Street station ticket hall. The bomb was defused. A week later another bomb was found by a member of staff at the same station and was also defused.
- 31 August: A bomb exploded in Old Quebec Street, Marble Arch damaging two hotels.
- 8 September 1973: A bomb exploded in the ticket office at Victoria station injuring 4 people.
- 10 September 1973: King's Cross station and Euston station bombings: Two 2 to 3 pounds (0.9 to 1.4 kg) bombs at mainline stations injured 13 people and brought chaos to central London. The first explosion at King's Cross station – which injured five people – occurred without any warning at 1224 BST, seconds after a witness saw a youth throw a bag into a booking hall. Fifty minutes later a second blast rocked a snack bar at Euston station, injuring a further eight people.
- 18 December 1973: 1973 Westminster bombing: A bomb exploded in Thorney Street, which leads off Horseferry Road. The bomb was planted in a car which was known to have been stolen in London, and was parked outside Horseferry House, a building occupied by the Home Office, and opposite Thames House, which is mainly occupied by the Department of Trade and Industry. Both these buildings, and others nearby, were extensively damaged. At least 40 people were injured.
- 24 December 1973: The Provisional IRA left two packages which exploded almost simultaneously in the late evening on Christmas Eve. One was in the doorway of the North Star public house, at the junction of College Crescent and Finchley Road, Swiss Cottage, which exploded injuring six people, and the other exploded on the upstairs verandah of the nearby Swiss Cottage Tavern where an unspecified number of people were injured.
- 26 December 1973: A bomb was detonated in a telephone kiosk in the booking hall at Sloane Square station. Nobody was injured.

1974

- 5 January 1974: Two bombs exploded within three minutes of each other. The first at Madame Tussauds, the second during the Boat Show at Earls Court Exhibition Centre. Police confirmed a telephone warning had been given shortly before both explosions allowing evacuations at both sites and there were no fatalities or injuries reported. It was later confirmed the devices had been planted by the IRA.
- 19 May 1974: A bomb exploded on the third level of a multi-storey car park at Terminal 1 at Heathrow Airport, London. 50 to 100 pounds (23 to 45 kg) of explosive was left in a BMC 1100 car. The Press Association had received a warning at 11.05 a.m. and police were clearing the site at 11.17 a.m when the explosion occurred. Four people suffered minor injuries. Several vehicles were destroyed and others damaged. At 10.25 p.m. another warning was received about a bomb at the NAAFI headquarters in Kennington Lane. A police search found a bag containing about 30-pound (14 kg) of explosive at the rear of the building. The bomb was defused.
- 17 June 1974: 1974 Houses of Parliament bombing: A bomb exploded at the Houses of Parliament in London, causing extensive damage and injuring 11 people.
- 17 July 1974: 1974 Tower of London bombing: An explosion in the Tower of London left one person dead and 41 injured. This was the second bomb in London on this day. At 0430 BST there was an explosion at government buildings in Balham, South London. Nobody was injured in the morning blast but there was substantial damage to surrounding buildings.
- 11 October 1974: Bombs explode at Victory Services Club and Army and Navy Club. One injured.
- 22 October 1974: Brook's Club bomb attack: A 5-pound (2.3 kg) bomb exploded in the Brooks Club, London, injuring three members of staff.
- 24 October 1974: Harrow School bombing: No injuries.
- 7 November 1974: An off-duty soldier and a civilian were killed when a bomb was thrown through the window of the Kings Arms pub in Woolwich, and 28 people were injured.
- 25 and 27 November 1974: 1974 London pillar box bombings: Provisional IRA exploded bombs inside pillar boxes in various places around London, injuring 40 people.
- 30 November 1974: A device exploded near Talbot Public House in Little Chester Street, SW1. Eight people injured.
- 11 December 1974: One person was wounded in an explosion at the Naval and Military Club in Piccadilly.
- 14 December 1974: Shooting at the Churchill Hotel in Portman Square injured four people.
- 17 December 1974: Bombs detonated on two telephone exchanges: one on Draycott Avenue, SW3, injuring four people; another in Chenies Street, killing one person and injuring another.
- 19 December 1974: Oxford Street bombing: The IRA carried out a bomb attack on Selfridge's department store in Oxford Street, London. A time bomb had been placed in a car which was then parked outside the store. Three telephone warnings were given and the area was evacuated. The explosion was later estimated to have caused £1.5 million worth of damage.
- 21 December 1974: A bomb exploded on the first floor in the furniture department of Harrods department store in Knightsbridge, London causing a fire but without injuries. Another bomb was defused in the King's Arms public house in Warminster, Wiltshire.
- 22 December 1974: A 2-pound (0.9 kg) car bomb exploded at former Prime Minister Edward Heath's home in Victoria, London. Heath was not at home at the time but arrived 10 minutes later. Minor damage. No injuries.

1975

- 19 January 1975: Eight people were injured in machinegun attacks on Portman Hotel and Carlton Tower Hotel.
- 23 January 1975: A time bomb at the Woodford Waterworks pumping station in North London exploded, causing three injuries.
- 27 January 1975: Seven time-bombs at multiple spots in London. At 6:30 pm a bomb exploded at Gieves, in Old Bond Street. At 9:30 pm bombs exploded at the Moreson chemical plant in Ponders End and a disused gas works in Enfield. Only minimal damage was caused by these two bombs. Two further bombs exploded in Kensington High Street and Victoria Street. A warning was given of a bomb in Putney High Street and a British Army bomb-disposal officer was able to defuse the device. A warning was also given for a bomb in Hampstead and it was defused. Two people were injured from the Kensington High Street bomb.
- 26 February 1975: Murder of Stephen Tibble.
- 28 August 1975: Seven people were injured when a bomb exploded near Peter Browns Outfitters in Oxford Street, London, outside the south-east corner of Selfridges store. A telephone warning was issued to The Sun newspaper five minutes before the explosion.
- 29 August 1975: One person was killed in an explosion in Kensington Church Street.
- 5 September 1975: London Hilton bombing: Two people were killed and 63 injured when an IRA bomb exploded in the lobby of the Hilton hotel in London.
- 29 September 1975: Bomb in Oxford Street injured seven.
- 9 October 1975: 1975 Piccadilly bombing: A bomb detonated at a bus stop outside Green Park tube station, killing 23-year-old Graham Ronald Tuck and injuring at least 20 people – two of them children.
- 12 October 1975: Bomb planted at Lockett's Restaurant in Marsham Street, Westminster, a popular haunt of Tory MPs. It contained 27.5 lb of gelignite. It was spotted by the restaurant manager and defused with minutes to spare.
- 23 October 1975: Device explodes in Campden Hill Square, W8, killing one person and injuring one.
- 29 October 1975: Trattoria Fiore bombing: 18 people are injured in a bomb attack on an Italian restaurant.
- 3 November 1975: Several people injured by a car bomb in Connaught Square, London W2.
- 12 November 1975: Scott's Oyster Bar bombing - one killed and 15 hurt.
- 17 November 1975: Walton's Restaurant bombing: A bomb was thrown through a window into Walton's Restaurant in Walton Street, Knightsbridge, killing two people and injuring 23 others. The restaurant was owned by established restaurateurs Robert Wren and Norman Swallow and was often frequented by celebrity diners.
- 27 November 1975: Ross McWhirter was shot at his home Village Road, Bush Hill Park, Enfield, Middlesex by two IRA volunteers, Harry Duggan and Hugh Doherty, and died soon after in hospital.
- 6–12 December 1975: Balcombe Street Siege: Four IRA members held two people hostage at 22b Balcombe Street.

1976

- 29 January 1976: 12 bombs exploded in the West End of London during the night. A 13th device was discovered later in an HMV record store. The bombs were small, between about 3 to 5 pounds (1.4 to 2.3 kg). Several started small fires. One person was injured.
- 13 February 1976: A 30-pound (14 kg) bomb was found in a small case at Oxford Circus station and was defused.
- 21 February 1976: Bomb at Selfridges in Oxford Street cause five injuries.
- 4 March 1976: Cannon Street train bombing: A 10-pound (4.5 kg) bomb exploded in an empty train near Cannon Street station, injuring eight people in a passing train.
- 15 March 1976: West Ham station attack: An IRA bomb exploded on a Metropolitan line train at West Ham station, on the Hammersmith & City section of the line. The bomber, Vincent Donnelly, possibly took the wrong train and attempted to return to his destination. However, the bomb detonated prior to reaching the City of London. Donnelly shot Peter Chalk, a Post Office engineer, and shot and killed the train's driver Julius Stephen, who had attempted to catch the perpetrator. Donnelly then shot himself, but survived and was apprehended by police.
- 16 March 1976: An empty train was severely damaged by a bomb at Wood Green station. The train was about to pick up fans from an Arsenal football match, but the bomb detonated prior to arriving at the station, injuring one passenger standing on the platform. Three men were sentenced to 20 years imprisonment for this attack.
- 27 March 1976: 1976 Olympia bombing: A bomb placed by the Provisional IRA exploded in a litter bin at the top of an escalator in a crowded exhibition hall. Approximately 15,000 people were attending the Daily Mail Ideal Home Exhibition at the time, and 80 people were injured. One woman later dies of her injuries.

1977

- 29 January 1977: Thirteen bombs detonated in and around Oxford Street within 50 minutes shortly after midnight, wrecking buildings and setting Selfridges ablaze. At least one man was injured.

1978

- 18 December 1978: Three bombs exploded near the British Museum and YMCA. Four people were hurt.

1979

- 18 January 1979: A Provisional IRA bomb explodes, damaging gas holders and causing a fire at the East Greenwich Gas Works. The bombing occurred a few hours after another bomb exploded at a Texaco fuel facility at Canvey Island.
- 30 March 1979: Shadow Northern Ireland Secretary Airey Neave was killed as he left the House of Commons car park by a car bomb planted by the Irish National Liberation Army (INLA) in 1979.

==== 1980–1989 ====
1980

- 2 December 1980: A device exploded at Princess Louise Regiment Territorial Army Centre, Hammersmith Road, London W6, injuring five people.

1981

- 8 January 1981: A bomb was planted in the Suvla barrack block at RAF Uxbridge. The device was discovered and petrol surrounding the bomb was moved away. The 35 RAF musicians and 15 airmen living there were evacuated before it exploded. The building was damaged by the blast and debris thrown across the Hillingdon Road but no one was injured.
- 10 October 1981: Chelsea Barracks bombing: A bomb blast on Ebury Bridge Road next to Chelsea Barracks killed two people and injured 39.
- 17 October 1981: A bomb attached to a car in Dulwich, London SE21 injured one person, Lieutenant-General Sir Steuart Pringle.
- 26 October 1981: A bomb planted by the IRA in a Wimpy Bar on Oxford Street killed Kenneth Howorth, the Metropolitan Police explosives officer who was attempting to defuse it.
- 23 November 1981: A device exploded at Royal Artillery HQ, Government House, Woolwich New Road, London SE18 injuring two people.

1982

- 20 July 1982: Hyde Park and Regent's Park bombings: Two bombs in Hyde Park and Regent's Park, London by the Provisional IRA killed 11 members of the Household Cavalry and the Royal Green Jackets. Seven horses were also killed.
- 28 November 1982: A parcel bomb exploded in 10 Downing Street, the residence of Prime Minister Margaret Thatcher, slightly injuring an aide. The INLA claimed responsibility in a call to a Belfast radio station.

1983

- 10 December 1983: A device exploded at Royal Artillery Barracks, Repository Road, London SE18 injuring three people.
- 17 December 1983: Harrods bombings: Harrods West London department store was bombed by the IRA during Christmas shopping. Six people were killed (including three police officers) and 90 injured.

1985

- 23 June 1985: A bomb was found at the Rubens Hotel, a tourist hotel near Buckingham Palace, and made safe, based on information obtained following the arrest of 12 people including Patrick Magee who was wanted in connection with the bombing of the Grand Hotel in Brighton in September 1984. It was believed to be part of a campaign and hotels in resorts throughout Britain were searched.
- 11 November 1985: Three bombs planted by the Irish National Liberation Army (INLA) outside Chelsea Barracks were discovered and defused.

1988

- 1 August 1988: Inglis Barracks bombing: A device exploded in an accommodation block at the Postal & Courier Depot Royal Engineers, Inglis Barracks, London NW7 killing one lance corporal and injuring nine other soldiers.

1989

- 15 November 1989: A device was discovered in Kensington and defused. No injuries.

==== 1990–1999 ====
1990

- 14 May 1990: 1990 Eltham bombing: A device exploded at Service Education Centre, Eltham, injuring seven people.
- 16 May 1990: 1990 Wembley bombing: The IRA planted a bomb underneath a minibus at the Army Recruiting Centre in Wembley, which detonated killing Sgt Charles Chapman and injuring four others.
- 23 May 1990: A car was involved in a high-speed chase in Lordship Lane, Tottenham, north London and contained two loaded Kalashnikov semi-automatic rifles discovered by police afterwards
- 9 June 1990: Honourable Artillery Company bombing: An explosion at Honourable Artillery Company HQ, City Road, London EC1 injured 19 people.
- 21 June 1990: A device exploded at RAF Stanmore Park, Uxbridge. No injuries.
- 25 June 1990: Carlton Club bombing: A bomb exploded at Carlton Club, St. James, London SW1 injuring 20 people.
- 6 July 1990: A small device exploded in a litter bin in The Strand, London WC2. No injuries.
- 20 July 1990: London Stock Exchange bombing: The IRA detonated a large bomb at the London Stock Exchange causing massive damage but no injuries.
- 6 August 1990: A device was discovered at the former home of Lord Armstrong in London NW8 and defused. No injuries.
- 17 September 1990: An Army colour sergeant was shot and injured as he sat in a car outside the Army Information Centre, Finchley, London.
- 27 September 1990: A device was discovered at the Royal Overseas League, Park Place, London WC1 and defused. No injuries.

1991

- 7 February 1991: Downing Street mortar attack: Three mortar bombs were fired at 10 Downing Street. One minor injury.
- 18 February 1991: Victoria station and Paddington station bombings: A bomb exploded in Paddington station, damaging the building's roof but causing no casualties. Three hours later another bomb exploded at Victoria station. One man was killed and 38 people injured.
- 28 June 1991: A device was discovered outside the Beck Theatre, Hayes, Middlesex and defused. No injuries.
- 5 August 1991: A fire was caused by incendiary devices at the Cambridge Public House, Charing Cross Road, London. No injuries.
- 29 August 1991: Three incendiary devices were discovered under a seat at London Underground Depot, Hammersmith W6. No injuries.
- 31 August 1991: An incendiary device was discovered at the Bargain Bookshop, Charing Cross Road, London WC2. No injuries.
- 1 December 1991: A number of incendiary devices ignited at The Discount Furniture Store, Habitat, The World of Leather, The Reject Shop, Tottenham Court Road causing damage to property but no injuries.
- 2 December 1991: An incendiary device ignited at Littlewoods, Oxford Street, London W1. No injuries.
- 14 December 1991: Four devices were found in shops at the Brent Cross Shopping Centre. No injuries.
- 15 December 1991: An incendiary device partially ignited at the Sainsbury Wing, National Gallery, London WC2. No injuries.
- 16 December 1991: A bomb exploded on the railway line near Clapham Junction. No injuries.
- 23 December 1991: Incendiary devices ignited at Ilford Underground Depot, Neasden Underground Deport and on a train at Harrow on the Hill. No injuries.

1992

- 10 January 1992: A small device exploded at Whitehall Place, London SW1. No injuries.
- 17 January 1992: Two incendiary devices were discovered at the Marquis of Granby Public House, Shaftesbury Avenue, London W1. No injuries.
- 30 January 1992: An incendiary device was found at Elephant and Castle Underground Depot, London SE17. No injuries.
- 3 February 1992: An incendiary device was found under a seat at Neasden Underground Depot. No injuries.
- 7 February 1992: An incendiary device ignited at London Underground Sidings between Barking and Upney stations. No injuries.
- 11 February 1992: A small device was discovered in a telephone box outside the Treasury, Parliament Street, London SW1 and made safe. No injuries.
- 28 February 1992: London Bridge bombing: A bomb exploded at London Bridge station injuring 29 people.
- 29 February 1992: Device exploded at the Crown Prosecution Service, London EC4 injuring two people.
- 1 March 1992: A small device was discovered at White Hart Lane railway station Tottenham, London N17 and defused.
- 10 March 1992: A small device exploded beside railway line near Wandsworth Common railway station, London SW18. No injuries.
- 6 April 1992: A device exploded outside a building housing various offices at Bridle Lane, near Piccadilly Circus, London W1.
- 10 April 1992: Baltic Exchange bombing: A large bomb exploded outside 30 St Mary Axe in the City of London. The bomb was contained in a large white truck and consisted of a fertiliser device wrapped with a detonation cord made from Semtex. It killed three people: Paul Butt, aged 29; Thomas Casey, aged 49, a Baltic Exchange employee; and 15-year-old Danielle Carter. Several other people were critically or severely injured. The bomb also caused damage to surrounding buildings (many of which were further damaged by a second bomb the following year). The bomb caused £800 million worth of damage—£200 million more than the total damage costs resulting from all 10,000 previous explosions that had occurred relating to the Troubles in Northern Ireland. A new skyscraper was built on the site of the previous historic building.
- 11 April 1992: 1992 Staples Corner bombing: A large bomb exploded underneath the A406 flyover at Staples Corner, causing serious damage to roads and nearby buildings including a B&Q DIY store and causing the closure of the junction. The blast was large enough to be felt many miles away.
- 7 June 1992: A device exploded at the Royal Festival Hall, London SE1 causing blast damage. No injuries.
- 10 June 1992: A small device exploded in a litter bin near the Army and Navy department store, Wilcox Place, Victoria Street. No injuries.
- 15 June 1992: A device exploded in a taxi cab, which had been hijacked, at St. Albans Street, near Piccadilly Circus. No injuries.
- 25 June 1992: A device hidden in a brief case exploded at Coleman Street, City of London EC2.
- 6 September 1992: A small device exploded in the gents' toilets in the foyer of the London Hilton Hotel, Park Lane, London W1 causing little damage and no casualties.
- 17 September 1992: Two incendiary devices caused a small fire at Madame Tussaud's, Marylebone Road, London NW1. A small device exploded at The Planetarium, Marylebone Road, London NW1 causing minor damage. Two incendiary devices were discovered at Imperial War Museum, Lambeth Road, London SE1 and extinguished, causing minor damage.
- 7 October 1992: A small device exploded in a litter bin at the junction of The Haymarket and Panton Street, Piccadilly SW1. Five people suffered minor injuries. Minimal damage. A small device exploded behind a BT junction box near Centre Point, Flitcroft Street, London WC2 causing slight damage and no casualties.
- 8 October 1992: A device exploded under a car at Tooley Street, London SE1 causing damage to two other cars and slightly injuring one person; and a small device exploded under a car at Melcombe Street, London NW1, causing little damage and no injuries.
- 9 October 1992: Small device exploded under a car at the car park of the Royal British Legion, Nursery Road, Southgate N14. No injuries. A small device exploded under a car at the Car Park, Arnos Grove Underground Station. No injuries.
- 10 October 1992: A device exploded in a phone box outside Paddington Green Police Station, Harrow Road, Paddington W2. One person injured.
- 12 October 1992: Sussex Arms bombing: A device exploded in the gentlemen's toilet of the Sussex Arms public house in Covent Garden, killing one person (who died the following day as a result of injuries) and injuring four others.
- 19 October 1992: Small device exploded under the wheel arch of a coach parked outside the Novotel Hotel, Shortlands, Hammersmith W6. No casualties. Device exploded under a car at Oxenden Street, London SW1. Two people treated for shock.
- 21 October 1992: A device exploded on the track near Silver Street station Edmonton as a train was passing, causing little damage. Two people were treated for minor injuries. A device, believed to have been hung on railings at Princess Louise Territorial Army Centre, Hammersmith Road W6, exploded. Three people suffered minor injuries. A device exploded causing slight damage to the track near Harrow Road (junction with Furness Road) NW10, but no casualties.
- 22 October 1992: A small device exploded causing damage to a sewage pipe at Wick Lane E3. No casualties.
- 25 October 1992: A device exploded in a doorway in London SW1 causing some damage to the building and to nearby cars. No casualties.
- 30 October 1992: A small device exploded in a hijacked minicab outside Cabinet Office Whitehall, London SW1 (near Downing Street). No one was injured.
- 14 November 1992: Stoke Newington Road lorry bomb: A van discovered in Stoke Newington Road, London N16 containing a very large improvised explosive device. One policeman was shot and injured confronting two men.
- 15 November 1992: The IRA planted a bomb at Canary Wharf in the Docklands. The device was spotted by security guards and was deactivated safely.
- 16 November 1992: A device in van in Collingwood Street, Bethnal Green E1 was made safe.
- 1 December 1992: A large improvised explosive device in van at junction of Stephens Street and Tottenham Court Road made safe.
- 9 December 1992: An HME device partially detonated in a van in car park at Woodside Park Underground station, London N12. No injuries.
- 10 December 1992: Two devices exploded in litter bins outside shops at Wood Green Shopping Centre, London N22. Eleven people were slightly injured.
- 17 December 1992: A bomb hidden in a litter bin in a third-floor men's lavatory of the John Lewis department store, Oxford Street, London, by the IRA detonated just after 11 am. A second bomb exploded 15 minutes later at the rear of the store, in Cavendish Square, while shoppers and staff were still being evacuated. Four people were injured. Another small device exploded in a litter bin Cavendish Square, W1 slightly injuring three people.
- 22 December 1992: A small device exploded on an emergency staircase at Hampstead tube station.

1993

- 6 January 1993: Incendiary attacks on London shops: An incendiary device ignited at Reject Shop, Plaza Shopping Centre, London W1 causing minor damage; a very small device exploded at Dillons' Bookshop, Northumberland Avenue, WC2 causing little damage; an incendiary device ignited at C&A, Oxford Street, W1, causing very little damage; and an incendiary device ignited at Video Shop, 60 Oxford Street W1 causing minor damage. On 7 January 1993, an unignited incendiary device was found at Dillon's Bookshop, Northumberland Avenue W1. On 14 January 1993, an unignited incendiary device was found at Topshop, Oxford Circus W1.
- 28 January 1993: 1993 Harrods bombing: A bomb exploded in a litter bin outside Harrods, injuring four people and damaging 30 feet (9.1 m) of shop front.
- 3 February 1993: A small device exploded on train stopped at Kent House station, Kent and evacuated following warnings. No casualties. A device exploded in underground passageway at South Kensington tube station, London SW7 following a warning and evacuation. No casualties.
- 10 February 1993: A small device exploded in doorway of block of flats in London SW1. Minor damage. No injuries.
- 27 February 1993: Camden Town bombing: A bomb exploded in a litter bin outside a McDonald's restaurant in Camden Town, injuring 18 people, two seriously.
- 7 April 1993: A small device exploded in builders skip in Argyle Square, London WC1. Minor damage. No injuries
- 24 April 1993: Bishopsgate bombing: The IRA detonated a huge truck bomb in the City of London at Bishopsgate. It killed photographer Ed Henty, injured over 40 people, and causing approximately £1 billion worth of damage, including the near destruction of St Ethelburga's Bishopsgate church, and serious damage to Liverpool Street station. Police had received a coded warning, but were still evacuating the area at the time of the explosion. The area had already suffered damage from the Baltic Exchange bombing the year before.
  - The same day, two small devices exploded in hijacked minicabs at Manor House tube station, London N22 and Judd Street, St. Pancras, London WC1. No injuries.
- 28 August 1993: A small device containing Semtex was discovered in Wormwood Street, London (City) EC2. It was disrupted by a controlled explosion, causing no damage or injuries.
- 16 September 1993: Two small incendiary devices were found Curzon Phoenix Cinema, Charing Cross Road WC2. One small incendiary device found at the MGM Cinema, Shaftsbury Avenue WC2. They had all malfunctioned, causing no damage or injuries.
- 1 to 8 October 1993: Over eight days, a series of IRA bombs were left in various London locations. On 1 October, four bombs were left on Finchley Road, London NW8, three of which exploded on 2 October 1993. Five people were injured by falling glass. The fourth device was found and made safe. On 4 October, pairs of bombs were left in Highgate (where one failed to explode), two bombs exploded in Crouch End, and Archway, causing significant localised damage but no injuries. On 8 October, bombs exploded in Humber Road near the North Circular Road junction of Staples Corner and outside the Black Lion Public House at 295 West End Lane, West Hampstead, NW6, again causing damage but no injuries.
- 29 October 1993: A small device exploded beside a car in Edwardes Square W8 causing extensive damage to car but no injuries.
- 20 December 1993: A postal device was discovered at a sorting office, London EC1 and was made safe. No damage. No injuries. Six devices were discovered in a holdall at the Travellers Tavern, Elizabeth Street, Victoria, London SW1. At least one ignited. No injuries, minor damage. A package ignited at Mount Pleasant Sorting Office, London EC1. No injuries, minor damage. A small device ignited in a litter bin at Northfields Tube Station, London W13. No significant damage and no injuries.
- 21 December 1993: A series of coded bomb warnings closed 40 British Rail stations, paralysed large sections of London Underground, affected more than 350,000 commuters and cost the capital's economy an estimated £34 million. London Underground evacuated 50,000 to 60,000 people from 100 Tube stations in 15 minutes at the height of the morning rush hour. About 300,000 rail commuters were either stranded in trains or found services cancelled. Deliberately vague warnings followed an IRA tactic to cause widespread travel disruption was in and around the capital.

1994

- 27 to 29 January 1994: Incendiary devices ignited at C&A, Mothercare, Silverdale Travel Goods and Nightingales, all in Oxford Street W1, causing minor damage. Two more incendiary devices were discovered at C&A and Nightingales and made safe.
- 18 to 22 February 1994: Incendiary devices and one very small high explosive device were planted in various London shops: a record shop at 157 Charing Cross Road WC2; Topshop, Oxford Circus W1; Hennes, Oxford Circus W1; a newsagents (which was destroyed), Great Cumberland Place W1; Burtons, New Oxford Street WC1; Burtons, Regent Street W1; Liberty's, Regent Street W1; Mr. Byrite, Oxford Circus W1; and Mr. Handy, Edgware Road W2. Some devices ignited causing damage. Others were discovered and made safe. No injuries.
- 9 to 13 March 1994: Heathrow mortar attacks: The IRA launched a series of mortar attacks at the capital's main airport. On 9 March, four mortar bombs fired from a car parked at the Excelsior Hotel landed on or near the northern runway. On 11 March, four mortar bombs fired from waste ground landed on an aircraft parking area near Terminal 4. On 13 March, five mortar bombs launched from waste ground landed in the vicinity of Terminal Four. None exploded and there was no damage, but the attack caused much disruption to travel when areas of the airport were closed over the period.
- 10 June 1994: Two incendiary devices discovered at Liberty's, Oxford Street, London W1 and made safe.
- 11 June 1994: An incendiary device ignited at Mr. Byrite's, Oxford Street, London W1 causing little damage. A further device had failed to detonate.
- 22 August 1994: A high explosive device was found in litter bin outside Laura Ashley shop in Regent Street Wl and defused. There were no injuries or damage.

1996

- 9 February 1996: Docklands bombing: The IRA bombed the South Quay area of Canary Wharf, London, killing two people and injuring some 40, and causing an estimated £100 million worth of damage.
- 15 February 1996: A 5-pound (2.3 kg) high explosive bomb placed in a telephone box at the junction of Charing Cross Road and Litchfield Street, London WC2 was disarmed by Police.
- 18 February 1996: Aldwych bus bombing: A bomb detonated prematurely on a bus travelling along Wellington Street, Aldwych, London WC2, killing Edward O'Brien, the IRA terrorist transporting the device and injuring eight others.
- 8 March 1996: A bomb hidden in a litter bin exploded in Old Brompton Road near Earl's Court Exhibition Centre in west London, causing damage to vehicles.
- 17 April 1996: A bomb exploded before 10pm in The Boltons, Earl's Court Road, west London. No injuries occurred but it caused damage to properties.
- 24 April 1996: 1996 Hammersmith Bridge bomb: A major bomb that could have caused catastrophic damage failed to explode properly in west London.

1997

- 29 April 1997: A series of IRA bomb warnings and two bomb explosions on an electricity pylon near the M6 junction 10A disrupted transport networks in southern England and the midlands. In the London area, Heathrow airport and the M25 motorway were closed. A spokesman for Britain's transport industry claimed that a minimum of £30 million of losses had been caused.

=== Republican attacks after the Good Friday Agreement ===
After the Belfast Agreement came into effect in December 1999 the Real IRA, dissident republicans opposed to the Agreement, continued to carry out attacks in London.

2000

- 1 June 2000: A bomb planted by the Real IRA detonated on Hammersmith Bridge at 4.30 am, but failed to cause much damage.
- 19 July 2000: An explosive at Ealing Broadway station in west London at 10.30 am was discovered, and another in Whitehall in Westminster at 1.30 pm. Both were destroyed by police. Another bomb placed on a railway track in west London on the line to Ealing Broadway was also controllably exploded by police. It was intended to disrupt the Queen Mother's centenary pageant.
- 20 September 2000: 2000 MI6 attack: The SIS Building (commonly known as MI6 headquarters) in Vauxhall, Lambeth was attacked using a Russian-made RPG-22 anti-tank rocket. Striking the eighth floor, the missile caused superficial damage. The Anti-Terrorist branch of the Metropolitan Police attributed responsibility to the Real IRA.

2001

- 21 February 2001: A Real IRA bomb disguised as a torch exploded outside a British Army barracks in Shepherd's Bush, West London, after a 14-year-old army cadet picked it up. The cadet, Stephen Menary, lost his left hand and left eye, and suffered severe stomach and chest injuries.
- 3–4 March 2001: BBC Television Centre bombing: 10 to 20 pounds (4.5 to 9.1 kg) of high explosive had been placed in a red taxi and left near the main front door of BBC Television Centre, on Wood Lane in the White City area of West London. Just after midnight, police were attempting to carry out a controlled explosion on the bomb when it went off. Staff had already been evacuated after a coded warning. One person suffered cuts to his eye caused by glass debris. Damage included numerous smashed windows in the front entrance.
- 15 April 2001: A device packed with up to 1 lb of high explosives exploded outside a Royal Mail sorting office in Hendon, north London, at 23:28. The attack blew out windows but caused no injuries.
- 6 May 2001: Another bomb detonated at 01:53 outside the same Royal Mail office in Hendon, injuring one person. It was linked to the 20th anniversary of Bobby Sands's death.
- 3 August 2001: Ealing bombing: A car bomb containing 45-kilogram (99 lb) of explosives in Ealing Broadway, West London, England, injuring seven people. Apart from the damage caused directly by the explosion, around £200,000 of further damage to property in the adjacent Ealing Broadway shopping centre was caused by flooding from a ruptured water main.

== Attacks related to Middle East politics ==
1947

- 7 March 1947: The Stern Gang detonated a bomb in a London social club used by students and servicemen from the West-Indies and Africa, just off St Martin's Lane.
- 15 April 1947: a bomb consisting of twenty-four sticks of explosives was planted in the Colonial Office, Whitehall. It failed to explode due to a faulty timer. The bomb was planted by the same organisation as the March bomb.

1969

- 18 July 1969: Bombs planted by the Palestinian terrorist organization Popular Front for the Liberation of Palestine exploded in a Marks & Spencer store in London.

1970

- 6 September 1970: The Popular Front for the Liberation of Palestine (PFLP) attempted to hijack an El Al plane bound for Israel. The airline security officers killed one and wounded another of the terrorists.

1971

- 15 December 1971: The Jordanian Ambassador in London and former chief of the Jordanian royal court, Zaid al Rifai, was wounded when shots were fired at his car by Black September guerrillas.

1972

- 19 September 1972: Dr. Arni Shachori, counsellor for agricultural affairs at the Israeli embassy in London, was killed by a letter bomb sent from Amsterdam by Black September. Theodore Kaddar was also injured. Over the next few days, searches found a further twenty letter bombs addressed to embassy staff, at the embassy and a London post office. One of the letters opened by the police contained a note from Black September. There were similar attacks around the world.
- 10 November 1972: Vivian Prins, head of Hennig and Co, a Holborn gem dealer, was wounded in London when a letter bomb postmarked in India exploded in his face. Police in Glasgow intercepted another twelve letter bombs addressed to Jewish targets throughout Britain. 50 similar envelopes were intercepted in India.

1973

- 30 December 1973: Joseph Edward Sieff, president of Marks and Spencer, survived an assassination attempt at his home in Queen's Grove in St John's Wood, London, by 'Carlos' (Ilich Ramírez Sánchez) on behalf of the Popular Front for the Liberation of Palestine.

1974

- 24 January 1974: The PFLP claimed responsibility for explosives thrown at a Bank Hapoalim branch in Mayfair.

1977

- 10 April 1977: The former Prime Minister of the Yemen Arab Republic, Kadhi Abdullah al-Hagri; his wife Fatmiah; and the minister at the Yemeni embassy in London were shot and killed in their car outside the Royal Lancaster Hotel near Hyde Park. The killer has never been identified, though a report in a Palestinian newspaper named one of the hijackers of Lufthansa Flight 181 as being wanted in connection with the killing.

1978

- 20 August 1978: A PFLP member led an armed machine-gun attack at a coach carrying El Al crew in Mayfair.

1980

- 30 April to 5 May 1980: Iranian Embassy siege: Six armed men stormed the Iranian embassy in South Kensington, London, taking 26 people hostage—mostly embassy staff, but also several visitors and a police officer. The hostage-takers were Iranian Arabs campaigning for Arab national sovereignty in Khūzestān Province. The siege ended after six days when the terrorists killed one of the hostages and the SAS stormed the building, rescuing all but one of the remaining hostages and killing five of the six terrorists. The remaining terrorist served 27 years in British prisons.

1982

- 3 June 1982: The Israeli Ambassador to Britain, Shlomo Argov, was shot outside the Dorchester Hotel by three gunmen from the Abu Nidal group. The ambassador survived a three-month coma, but was paralysed and required constant medical attention until his death in 2003 as a result of the wounds.

1983

- 26 December 1983: On Boxing Day a bomb exploded outside a Marks & Spencer supermarket in Orchard Street, W1, seriously injuring two people. Although the IRA was initially blamed, it later emerged that the Abu Nidal Organisation was responsible.

1984

- 17 April 1984: Policewoman Yvonne Fletcher was killed by shots fired from the Libyan People's Bureau in St. James's Square, London at anti-Qadhafi demonstrators; Libyan diplomats were expelled after a 10-day siege.
- 20 April 1984: 1984 Heathrow Airport bombing: 22 were injured by a bomb in the airport baggage area. The Angry Brigade claimed responsibility, but officials blamed Libyan-linked groups.

1986

- 17 April 1986; Hindawi affair: a failed attempt to bomb a Heathrow plane bound for Israel.
- 21 August 1986: A bomb exploded in an Iranian-owned shop in West London, killing a son of the shop owner and wounding twelve people. The shop sold videotapes and literature opposed to Iranian leader Ayatollah Ruhollah Khomeini. Iranian opposition groups blamed the Iranian government for the bombing, while the Iranian government called it a botched attempt to bomb the Iranian Embassy.

1989

- 3 August 1989: A man using the alias Mustafa Mahmoud Mazeh accidentally killed himself and damaged two floors of a central London hotel while preparing a bomb intended to kill Salman Rushdie.

1994

- 26 July 1994: A large car bomb exploded outside the Israeli Embassy in London, injuring 20 people. Thirteen hours later another car bomb exploded outside Balfour House, the headquarters in London of several Jewish organisations, injuring six. Two Palestinians educated in the UK, Jawad Botmeh and Samar Alami, were found guilty of "conspiracy to cause explosions" at the Old Bailey. According to MI5 whistleblower and 911 'truther' Annie Machon "... MI5's official assessment of this attack, after reviewing all the evidence and all the intelligence, was that Mossad had attacked their own embassy in a controlled explosion. They did this for two reasons: first to gain enhanced security around Israeli interests in London, and secondly to shatter a fast-growing Palestinian support network in which Alami and Botmeh happened to be active."

1997

- 2–13 January 1997: A series of letter bombs with postmarks from Alexandria, Egypt, were discovered at Al-Hayat newspaper bureaus in Washington, D.C.; New York City; London; and Riyadh, Saudi Arabia. Three similar devices, also postmarked in Egypt, were found at a prison facility in Leavenworth, Kansas. Bomb disposal experts defused all the devices, except one that detonated at the Al-Hayat office in London, injuring two security guards and causing minor damage.

== Anarchist attacks ==
1894

- 15 February 1894: Anarchist Martial Bourdin was killed by his own bomb outside the Royal Observatory in Greenwich Park. There were no other casualties. Joseph Conrad's novel The Secret Agent, published in 1907, drew on this event.

1897

- 26 April 1897: A bomb left by an anarchist group on a Metropolitan Railway train exploded at Aldersgate Street station (now Barbican). One person, Harry Pitts, was killed and sixty people were injured, ten seriously.

1967

- 3 March 1967: Six bombs damaged the buildings of diplomatic missions in London, the Hague and Turin. Responsibility for the actions was claimed by the First of May Group – a Spanish and English-based anarchist resistance movement, formed to oppose Franco's government in Spain.

1968

- 3 January 1968: A mortar device was found facing the Greek Embassy in London. On 27 February, the Hornsey home of Stuart Christie was raided by police led by Det. Sgt. Roy Cremer with a warrant relating to the Greek Embassy explosives, and information received that other attacks were about to take place in London. Christie was subsequently tried as one of the 'Stoke Newington Eight' and acquitted.
- 13 October 1968: The Imperial War Museum was attacked by an arsonist, Timothy John Daly, who claimed he was acting in protest against the exhibition of militarism to children. Damage was valued at approximately £200,000, not counting the loss of irreplaceable books and documents. On his conviction in 1969 he was sentenced to four years in prison.

1969

- 3 February 1969: Explosives, planted by the First of May Group were found on the premises of the Bank of Bilbao and the Bank of Spain in London.
- 15 March 1969: An explosion occurred at the Bank of Bilbao in London. Two anarchists, Alan Barlow and Phil Carver, were arrested immediately afterwards. In their possession was a letter claiming the action on behalf of the First of May Group.
- 17 August 1969: A fire bomb was planted at the Ulster Office in London.
- 9 October 1969: Petrol bombs were found in a left luggage locker in London.

1970

- 28 March 1970: A bomb was found at Waterloo station.
- 6 May 1970: Petrol bombs were thrown at the American Embassy, London.
- 10 May 1970: An incendiary device was found aboard Iberian Airliner at Heathrow. Similar devices were found in other European capitals on planes belonging to Iberia. The First of May Group were responsible.
- 22 May 1970: An explosive device was discovered at a new police station in Paddington. This was later claimed by the prosecution in the trial of the 'Stoke Newington Eight' to be the first action undertaken by The Angry Brigade.
- May 1970 to January 1971: Firebomb attacks took place on Conservative Associations at Wembley (19 May); Brixton (10 June); Wimbledon (21 September); Hampstead (26 September) and Slough (30 January 1971), these were carried out by the Angry Brigade.
- June and July 1970: Firebomb attacks took place against Army targets including an Army depot in Kimber Road, SW18 (30 June); an Army recruiting office in South London (7 July); and an Army Officer Training Centre, Holborn (7 July) by the Angry Brigade.
- June to October 1970: Bomb attacks were carried out by the Angry Brigade on police and judicial targets including Lambeth Court (18 June); the home of a retired policeman in Stoke Newington (10 July); the home of the Commissioner of the Metropolitan Police, Sir John Waldron (30 August); and the home of Attorney General, Sir Peter Rawlinson, in Chelsea (8 September and 8 October).
- September and October 1970: Bombs were planted at Barclays Bank branches at Heathrow (26 September) and Stoke Newington (26 October) by the Angry Brigade.
- 20 November 1970: A bomb was planted by the Angry Brigade which exploded near a BBC van on the evening of the Miss World contest.
- 3 December 1970: A machine gun attack on the Spanish Embassy in London was carried out by the First of May Group.
- 9 December 1970: A bomb was planted by the Angry Brigade exploded at the Department of Employment and Productivity in St. James's Square, London, shortly after a police search.

1971

- 12 January 1971: Two bombs planted by the Angry Brigade exploded at the Hertfordshire home of the Minister of Employment Robert Carr.
- 18 March 1971: A bomb was planted by the Angry Brigade at the offices of the Ford Motor Company at Gants Hill, Ilford. There was a strike at Ford Dagenham throughout the summer.
- 1 May 1971: A bomb planted by the Angry Brigade exploded at the Biba boutique in Kensington
- 22 July 1971: A bomb planted by the Angry Brigade exploded at the home of William Batty, a director of the Ford plant at Dagenham. Another bomb damaged a transformer at the Dagenham plant.

The Bomb Squad was established at Scotland Yard in January 1971 to target the Angry Brigade, and following raids on the homes of suspects, they were arrested in August 1971.

1984

- 20 April 1984: 1984 Heathrow Airport bombing: 22 were injured by a bomb in the airport baggage area. The Angry Brigade claimed responsibility, but officials blamed Libyan-linked groups.

== Militant Suffragette actions ==
With increased militancy in the Women's Social and Political Union in 1912, a bombing and arson campaign was started. Both some Suffragettes and the authorities talked of arson and bomb attacks as terrorism. Contemporary newspaper reports in the UK and in the US likewise spoke of "Suffragette Terrorism" in the UK. Modern scholarship has a range of views as to the applicability of the term "terrorism" to these events.

=== 1912 ===
- 29 November 1912: Simultaneous suffragette attacks on post boxes occurred across the entire country using dangerous chemicals. In London, many letters burst into flames upon discovery at post offices. Paraffin and lit matches are also put in pillar boxes.

=== 1913 ===
- 8 February 1913: Suffragette arson attack on the Orchid House at Kew Gardens.
- 19 February 1913: Suffragette bomb attack on Lloyd George's house, planted by Emily Davison. Significant damage was done to the building, but there were no injuries.
- 20 February 1913: Suffragette arson attack destroying the Tea Pavilion at Kew Gardens. Olive Wharry and Lilian Lenton were arrested at the scene and both imprisoned.
- 22 February 1913: A postman was burned at Lewisham post office, south London, when handling a suffragette letter bomb.
- 4 April 1913: Gunpowder bomb placed outside the Bank of England by Suffragettes, but it is defused before it can detonate in the public street.
- 9 April 1913: Two bombs were left on the Waterloo to Kingston train line by suffragettes, placed on trains going in opposite directions. One bomb was found at Battersea on the train coming from Kingston when the railway porter discovered smoke in a previously crowded third-class carriage. Four hours later, as the other train from Waterloo pulled into Kingston, the third-class carriage exploded and was consumed by fire. The rest of the carriages were full of passengers, but they manage to escape.
- 18 April 1913: A suffragette plot to blow up the grandstand at Crystal Palace football ground on the eve of the 1913 FA Cup Final is foiled.
- May 1913: Three London postmen are injured by their exposure to noxious substances the suffragettes purposely placed in pillar boxes.
- 2 May 1913: The suffragettes plant a highly unstable nitroglycerine bomb on the platform at Piccadilly Circus tube station. Although it had the potential to harm many members of the public, the bomb is successfully defused.
- 7 May 1913: A bomb is planted by the suffragettes at St. Paul's Cathedral, London, but it is discovered.
- 10 May 1913: A suffragette bomb is discovered in the waiting room at Liverpool Street Station, covered with iron nuts and bolts intended to maximise damage to property or anyone in proximity.
- 14 May 1913: A letter bomb is sent by suffragettes to anti-women's suffrage magistrate Sir Henry Curtis-Bennett at Bow Street in an attempt to assassinate him. The bomb is intercepted by London postal workers. Suffragettes again attempt to assassinate Curtis-Bennett by pushing him off a cliff two days later at Margate.
- 14 May 1913: Three suffragette bombs are discovered in the third-class carriage of a crowded passenger train arriving from Waterloo at Kingston, filled with nitro-glycerine.
- 16 May 1913: A suffragette bomb is discovered at Westbourne Park tube station before it can explode.
- 2 June 1913: Suffragette bomb discovered at the South Eastern District Post Office, London, containing enough nitroglycerin to blow up the entire building and kill the 200 people who worked there.
- 18 December 1913: The suffragettes bomb a wall at Holloway Prison in an attempt to free an inmate inside. Many houses near the prison were damaged or had their windows blown out by the bombs, showering some children with glass while they slept. One of the perpetrators of the attack was injured by the blast.

=== 1914 ===
- 5 April 1914: A bomb exploded in St Martin-in-the-Fields church in Trafalgar Square, London, blowing out the windows and showering passers-by with broken glass. The explosion started a fire in the church. The suffragettes are responsible.
- 11 May 1914: A bomb is discovered before it can explode in the Metropolitan Tabernacle church, London. The bomb was placed by the suffragettes.
- 11 June 1914: A bomb explodes at Westminster Abbey; damaging the Coronation Chair. The suffragettes are responsible.
- 13 June 1914: A suffragette bomb is discovered before it can explode in St. Paul's Cathedral.

== Other attacks in the 20th century ==
- 31 October 1971: A bomb exploded at 0430GMT on the 33rd floor of the Post Office Tower causing extensive damage but no injuries. Shortly after the blast the tower and the restaurant were closed to the public. The "Kilburn Battalion" of the IRA claimed responsibility for the explosion. The attack was later attributed to the Angry Brigade, it remains unclear who was responsible.
- 20 December 1975: Biddy Mulligan's pub bombing: The Ulster Defence Association (UDA) bombs Biddy Mulligan's pub in Kilburn, injuring five people.
- 7 January 1981: A letter bomb sent to Prime Minister Margaret Thatcher was intercepted by a London postal worker. The Scottish Socialist Republican League claimed responsibility in a telephone call to a newspaper.
- 14 March 1982: 1982 bombing of the African National Congress headquarters in London: The London offices of the African National Congress were wrecked by an 11-kilogram (24 lb) bomb which exploded against the rear wall at 9 am. Windows up to 400 yards away were broken. The caretaker, an ANC voluntary worker, who was sleeping in a flat above the offices, was injured. Nine former South African security policemen admitted to the attack at an amnesty hearing of the Truth and Reconciliation Commission in Pretoria in 1999.
- 22 November 1982: A letter bomb was sent to Industry Secretary, Patrick Jenkin. It was intercepted by his secretary and made safe. The Scottish National Liberation Army (SNLA) claimed responsibility and said it was in retaliation for the partial closure of a steelworks in Motherwell.
- In 1983 there were 27 SNLA attacks, including letter-bombs to Margaret Thatcher (sent to a north London hotel where she was speaking, opened by Robert Key MP and made safe) and the Princess of Wales.
- April 1985: The SNLA detonated a small bomb inside a Ministry of Defence building, causing significant damage to the property.
- 31 October 1985, Tony Lecomber, a right-wing activist, was injured by a nail bomb that he was carrying to the offices of the Workers Revolutionary Party in Clapham. Police found 10 grenades, seven petrol bombs and two detonators at his home. He received a three-year prison sentence.
- 6 December 1994: Edgar Pearce bombs six Barclays Bank branches throughout north and west London. Two members of staff were injured.
- 19 May 1995 to 20 April 1996: Edgar Pearce launches a series of 18 small bombings throughout London. One device at a Barclays Bank in Ealing on 20 April 1996 injured three people.
- 15 November 1997 to 17 March 1998: Edgar Pearce planted 11 devices near Sainsbury's stores throughout London.
- 17 to 30 April 1999: 1999 London nail bombings, David Copeland, a neo-Nazi with paranoid schizophrenia, carried out nail bomb attacks over three weekends against ethnic minorities and gay people in Brixton, Brick Lane and the Admiral Duncan pub in Old Compton Street, killing three people, including a pregnant woman, and injured 139, four of whom lost limbs. Copeland was convicted and given six concurrent life sentences.

== Attacks in the 21st century ==
Excluding post-Belfast Agreement Irish republican attacks in 2001 (see above). The vast majority of 21st century terrorist attacks in London have been linked to Islamic terrorism.

2005

- 7 July 2005: A series of four coordinated suicide attacks in central London in which three bombs exploded on Underground trains between Aldgate and Liverpool Street stations, Russell Square and King's Cross St Pancras stations and Edgware Road and Paddington stations. A double-decker bus at Tavistock Square was also destroyed. The bombs were detonated by four British Islamist suicide bombers. The explosions killed 52 people and resulted in over 700 injuries.
- 21 July 2005: Four more bombings, unconnected with those on 7 July, were attempted on 21 July 2005 at Shepherd's Bush, Warren Street and Oval stations, as well as on a bus in Shoreditch. In these incidents, each bomb detonator fired, but did not ignite the main explosive charge.

2007

- 29 June 2007: Two unexploded car bombs were discovered in London. The first device was found in a car parked near the Tiger Tiger nightclub in Haymarket. Two large gas canisters and a large number of nails were found in the car. The second device was left in a blue Mercedes-Benz saloon in nearby Cockspur Street, but was not discovered until after the car had been towed away for illegal parking.

2013

- 22 May 2013: Murder of Lee Rigby: A British Army soldier, Fusilier Drummer Lee Rigby of the Royal Regiment of Fusiliers, was attacked and killed by Michael Adebolajo and Michael Adebowale near the Royal Artillery Barracks in Woolwich, southeast London.

2016

- On 20 October 2016, police conducted a controlled explosion on an improvised explosive device at North Greenwich after a passenger spotted an unattended bag filled with "wires and an alarm clock" aboard a Jubilee line train. The bomb failed to go off, and police said that it could have caused casualties had it exploded. The media and government called the events a "lapse of security" and the "most serious incident on the Tube since the 21/7 attempted bombing". It was later revealed that the bomber, Damon Smith, had "an interest in Islam" and had posed next to a photo of an Islamic extremist – although the judge in his case believed that he was not motivated by terrorism, but could not determine what his real motive was "with any degree of clarity or certainty".

2017

- 22 March 2017: At around 14:40 GMT, Briton Khalid Masood, drove a car into pedestrians on Westminster Bridge before crashing the car into the perimeter fence of the British Parliament in Westminster London. Masood then exited the vehicle and stabbed a police officer before being shot dead by police. About 40 people were injured and there were six deaths (including the police officer and Masood).
- April 2017: Between 2016 and 2017, an all-female suicide bomb and shooting plot to attack the British Museum was discovered. Safaa Boular, a 17-year-old at the time when the attack was anticipated to take place, became the youngest female in the UK to be imprisoned for plotting a terror attack in the UK, and was sentenced to a minimum of 11 years imprisonment. Her mother, her 22-year-old sister and another woman were also convicted for their parts in the plot. The mother and sister had bought knives and were planning to attack landmarks in Westminster. The mother was sentenced to six years and nine months’ imprisonment and an additional five years on licence, the sister was sentenced to a minimum of 16 years imprisonment and the fourth woman 28 months' imprisonment. In April 2023 it was reported that the mother wanted to be released from prison, claiming to not be a danger to the public.
- 3 June 2017: a van with three attackers inside was driven into pedestrians on London Bridge at 21:58 GMT. After exiting the vehicle, the attackers stabbed people in pubs and restaurants in nearby Borough Market before being shot dead by police at 22:16. Eleven people, including the three attackers, were killed and 48 people were injured.
- 19 June 2017: a van was driven into people walking near Finsbury Park Mosque in London after tarawih prayers. There were eleven injuries and one person died, although whether this victim died from the attack is unclear. The police declared the incident a terrorist attack.
- 25 August 2017: A car driver was arrested by police outside Buckingham Palace. The suspect reached for a sword while seated inside his car when officers challenged him. He was charged with intent to commit an act of terrorism. Two police received minor injuries making the arrest.
- 15 September 2017: a homemade bomb partially detonated on a tube train at Parsons Green tube station at 08:20 BST (UTC+1). Twenty-two were injured, including eighteen who were hospitalised.

2018

- 14 August 2018, A Ford Fiesta swerved into pedestrians outside the palace of Westminster. The car then crossed over a traffic island before crashing into a security barrier.

2019

- 29 November 2019, Police shot dead a suspect, wearing a suspected fake suicide vest, after five people were injured in a stabbing incident near London Bridge. Three people were confirmed as having been killed, including the suspect.

2020

- 2 February 2020, In Streatham two people were stabbed before police shot the suspect, Sudesh Amman, dead.

2025

- 28 April 2025: A man was arrested while attempting to break into the Israeli embassy armed with knives. Both the police and the Israeli Foreign Ministry reported it as an attempted terror attack.

== See also ==
- Attacks on the London Underground
- List of terrorist incidents in Great Britain
- List of terrorist incidents (Worldwide)
