= 1992 London bombing =

1992 London bombing may refer to:

- Baltic Exchange bombing
- 1992 London Bridge bombing
- Sussex Arms bombing
- 1992 Staples Corner bombing
- December 1992 Wood Green bombing
- December 1992 West End bombs
