= 1993 London bombing =

1993 London bombing may refer to:

- 1993 Bishopsgate bombing in the City of London
- 1993 Harrods bombing
- 1993 Camden Town bombing
- October 1993 bombs in London
