= Attacks on the London Underground =

This is a list of deliberate attacks on the infrastructure, staff or passengers of the London Underground that have caused considerable damage, injury or death.

== 1800s ==
Date	Underground line	Location/Station	Incident	Deaths	Injuries
30 October 1883	Inner Circle	Near Paddington (Praed Street) station Between Charing Cross (now Embankment) and Westminster station	On 30 October, two bombs planted as part of the Fenian dynamite campaign exploded on the Inner Circle. The first bomb, planted on a train, exploded near Paddington (Praed Street) station damaging the train it was on and a passing train along with part of the station and the signal box. Sixty-two passengers were injured. At the same time, the second bomb exploded in the tunnel between Charing Cross (now Embankment) and Westminster stations. No trains were damaged or passengers hurt.	0	62
January 1885	Metropolitan Railway	Gower Street station (now Euston Square station)	In January 1885 a Fenian bomb exploded on a Metropolitan Railway train at Gower Street (now Euston Square) station.		
26 April 1897	Metropolitan Railway	Aldersgate Street station (now Barbican station)	On 26 April, a bomb left by a Russian anarchist group on a Metropolitan Railway train exploded at Aldersgate Street station (now Barbican). Sixty people were injured, ten seriously, but the only fatality was Harry Pitts (born in 1861 in Devon) who died from his injuries, becoming the first person to die due to a terrorist attack on the Underground. At the inquest into Pitts' death, the jury found that he had been killed "by a bomb, or some other explosive, maliciously placed in the carriage by some unknown person or persons". A verdict of "wilful murder" was recorded.	1	60

== 1900s ==
=== Suffragette attacks ===
Date	Underground line	Location/Station	Incident	Deaths	Injuries
2 May 1913	-	Piccadilly Circus tube station	On 2 May, the suffragettes plant a bomb containing nitroglycerine, a highly unstable and dangerous explosive, at Piccadilly Circus tube station. Although it had the potential to harm many on the busy platform, the bomb was discovered and dealt with before it could explode.	0	0
16 May 1913	-	Westbourne Park station	On 16 May, a bomb – planted by the suffragettes – was discovered at Westbourne Park station before it could explode.	0	0

=== IRA attacks between 1939 and 1993 ===
In 1969, the Irish Republican Army (1922–1969), split into the Official Irish Republican Army (active until declaring 1972 ceasefire) and the Provisional Irish Republican Army (active until declaring a 1997 ceasefire). All were Irish Republican paramilitary organizations which sought to end Northern Ireland's status within the United Kingdom and bring about a United Ireland through armed force. On a number of occasions the different iterations of IRA attacked the London Underground.

Date	Underground line	Location/Station	Incident	Deaths	Injuries
3 February 1939	-	Tottenham Court Road station Leicester Square station	On 3 February, bombs planted by the IRA exploded in the left luggage offices at Tottenham Court Road and Leicester Square stations.		
26 July 1939	-	King's Cross station Victoria station	On 26 July, bombs exploded at King's Cross and Victoria stations. In King's Cross, one man was killed and two wounded, whereas in Victoria five were injured (→ S-Plan).	1	7
23 August 1973	-	Baker Street station	On 23 August 1973, a bomb was found in an abandoned bag in Baker Street station ticket hall. The bomb was defused. A week later another bomb was found by a member of staff at the same station and was also defused. It was planted by the Provisional IRA.	0	0
26 December 1973	-	Sloane Square station	On 26 December 1973 a bomb was detonated in a telephone kiosk in the booking hall at Sloane Square station. Nobody was injured.	0	0
9 October 1975	-	Just outside Green Park station	On 9 October, a bomb detonated just outside Green Park station, killing one and injuring 20 people.	1	20
13 February 1976	-	Oxford Circus station	On 13 February, a 30-pound (14 kg) bomb was found in a small case at Oxford Circus station and was defused.	0	0
4 March 1976	-	Cannon Street station	On 4 March, a 10-pound (4.5 kg) bomb exploded on an empty train at Cannon Street station, injuring eight people in a passing train.	0	8
15 March 1976	Metropolitan line (on Hammersmith & City section)	West Ham station	On 15 March, an IRA bomb exploded on a Metropolitan line train at West Ham station, on the Hammersmith & City section of the line. The bomber, Vincent Donnelly, possibly took the wrong train and attempted to return to his destination. However, the bomb detonated prior to reaching the City of London. Donnelly shot Peter Chalk, a Post Office engineer, and shot and killed the train's driver Julius Stephen, who had attempted to catch the perpetrator. Donnelly then shot himself, but survived and was apprehended by police.	1	1
16 March 1976	-	Wood Green station	On 16 March, an empty train was severely damaged by a bomb at Wood Green station. The train was about to pick up fans from an Arsenal football match, but the bomb detonated prior to arriving at the station, injuring one passenger standing on the platform. Three men were sentenced to 20 years imprisonment for this attack.	0	1
17 March 1976	-	Neasden depot	On 17 March, a bomb was found on a train at Neasden Depot and later defused.	0	0
29 August 1991	-	Hammersmith depot	On 29 August, three incendiary devices were found under a seat at Hammersmith depot.	0	0
23 December 1991	-	Harrow-on-the Hill station Neasden depot	On 23 December, two IRA bombs exploded, one on a train at Harrow-on-the-Hill station causing no injuries, and a smaller one on a train at Neasden depot.	0	0
1992		Elephant & Castle station Neasden station Barking station	In 1992, the IRA placed incendiary devices on several trains. At Elephant & Castle station and Neasden station devices were found and defused. One device went off at Barking station.	0	0
9 October 1992	-	Car park of Arnos Grove station	On 9 October, a small bomb was planted under a car at the Arnos Grove station car park. No-one was injured.	0	0
9 December 1992	-	Car park of Woodside Park station	On 9 December, a van bomb partially detonated at the car park of Woodside Park station. No-one was injured but it caused evacuations and disruptions.	0	0
3 February 1993	-	Underground passageway at South Kensington station	On 3 February, a device exploded at an underground passageway at South Kensington station.		
20 December 1993	-	Northfields station	On 20 December, a device exploded in a litter bin in Northfields station.		
21 December 1993	-	100 tube stations	On 21 December, coded bomb warnings from the IRA resulted in a paralysed London Underground system, as tens of thousands were evacuated from 100 tube stations during the morning rush hour.		

== 2000s ==
=== 2005 terrorist attacks ===
In 2005 two groups of Islamist extremists attacked a number of underground lines and bus routes in London.

Date	Underground line	Location/Station	Incident	Deaths	Injuries
7 July 2005		Between Aldgate station and Liverpool Street station; Between Russell Square station and King's Cross St Pancras station; Between Edgware Road station and Paddington station	Main article: 7 July 2005 London bombings On 7 July 2005, bombs exploded on Underground trains between Aldgate and Liverpool Street stations, Russell Square and King's Cross St Pancras stations and Edgware Road and Paddington stations. A double-decker bus at Tavistock Square was also destroyed. The bombs were detonated by four homegrown terrorist suicide bombers. The explosions killed 52 people and resulted in over 700 injuries.		
21 July 2005		Shepherd's Bush Market station; Warren Street station; Oval station	Main article: 21 July 2005 London bombings Four more attacks, unconnected with those on 7 July, were attempted on 21 July 2005 at Shepherd's Bush Market, Warren Street and Oval stations, as well as on a bus in Bethnal Green. In these incidents, each bomb detonator fired, but did not ignite the main explosive charge. No injuries occurred as a result of this event.		

=== 2010s ===
Date	Underground line	Location/Station	Incident	Deaths	Injuries
20 October 2016	Jubilee line	North Greenwich station	Police conducted a controlled explosion on a device at North Greenwich station, after a driver on the Jubilee line became suspicious of a bag he had been handed as lost property which he found contained wires and a clock. A Metropolitan Police spokesman said the device looked "real enough". The station was evacuated and closed while delays affected the Jubilee line. On 21 October 2016, armed officers tasered and arrested Damon Smith, then aged 19, in relation to the incident. He was found to be interested in the Qu’ran, and it was initially suggested he acted under Islamist motivations, as he had drawn on information contained in a magazine associated with Al-Qaeda to make the device, but no evidence was found. He said he was against extremism. It would, however, have been a "viable device" if it had been assembled with only small modifications. On 3 May 2017, Smith was convicted of making or possessing an explosive substance with intent to endanger life. Smith claimed that he had intended only to commit a hoax and for the device not to be dangerous. He was sentenced to 15 years imprisonment later in the month.	0	0
15 September 2017	-	Parsons Green station	Main article: Parsons Green bombing On 15 September 2017, an improvised explosive was detonated at the Parsons Green station at around 8:20 am. The homemade bomb produced what witnesses called a "wall of fire", resulting in 22 injuries, primarily burns. Ahmed Hassan was tried for attempted murder in March 2018. He was convicted and sentenced to life imprisonment and must serve a minimum of 34 years.	0	22

== See also ==
- King's Cross station and Euston station bombings
- Suffragette bombing and arson campaign
- Cannon Street train bombing
- Victoria station and Paddington station bombings
- List of suffragette bombings
