= Stoke Newington Road lorry bomb =

1992 IRA bombing attempt in London, England

Coordinates: 51.553434°N 0.074844°W

Stoke Newington Road lorry bomb incident
- Part of the Troubles
- Location: Shacklewell, London, United Kingdom
- Date: 14 November 1992; 1:00 am (UTC)
- Attack type: Shooting
- Deaths: 0
- Injuries: 1
- Perpetrator: Provisional Irish Republican Army

On 14 November 1992, 3.2 tonnes of explosives was discovered during a routine check on a lorry travelling on Stoke Newington Road in Shacklewell, part of the A10, one of the main routes between London and the north. The Volvo lorry was stopped by police around 1 am; the occupants fled. Constable Raymond Hall - a former Royal Engineer soldier and Falklands War veteran - chased the suspects to a residential street, Belgrade Road no.7 where he was shot twice by one of them. Shortly afterwards police arrested one man, Irish lorry driver Patrick Kelly, a member of the Provisional IRA, who was alleged to have been driving the lorry.

The large amount of explosives, which was bigger than that used in the Baltic Exchange bombing earlier that year, could have caused "massive destruction". Investigations found detonation material inside the lorry as well. Officers from the Metropolitan Police Anti-Terrorist Branch were unable to determine the intended target, although it occurred on the day of the Lord Mayor's Show.

== Arrests and convictions ==
In October 1993, Kelly was convicted and sentenced to 25 years in prison for conspiracy to cause explosions, and for the attempted murder of Hall. Kelly was suffering from skin cancer whilst in prison, but was denied medical treatment during his time in three prisons in England and Northern Ireland. Campaigners - which included MP Jeremy Corbyn - won a case in 1996 to transfer him to a prison in Portlaoise in the Republic of Ireland, where under Irish jurisdiction he received medical treatment for his serious illness. Despite treatment Kelly died on 11 June 1997. He was buried in County Laois in the Republic and his funeral attended by many people from South Armagh.

In 1994, English IRA member Patrick Hayes, during sentencing at the Old Bailey for the 1993 Harrods bombing and an attempted bombing in Canary Wharf, said that he was the driver in the Stoke Newington Road incident and that Kelly was innocent, convicted because of his Irish nationality.

== See also ==
- Chronology of Provisional Irish Republican Army actions (1992–1999)
- 1993 Bishopsgate bombing
- 1992 Staples Corner bombing
- 1992 London Bridge bombing
- 1992 Manchester bombing
