= Jan Taylor =

British-born Irish Republican and political activist

Jan Alexander Taylor (known as Jan Taylor, born 18 November 1943) is an English-born left-wing activist in London and later an IRA member who was convicted in 1994 of bombing Harrods. Having had a career as a young man in the British Army, during which time he won a United Nations Peace Medal, he joined the violent anti-fascist group Red Action, a group which also had links to the Irish republican movement. He was arrested and convicted on minor charges on several occasions, such as advocating support for proscribed organisations, but by 1993 the Security Service had lost sight of him.

Arrested with another man, Patrick Hayes, for the Harrods bomb and several other offences, Taylor was sentenced to 30 years imprisonment the following year. However, under the Good Friday Agreement of 1998 he became eligible for early release, and in December the following year he was among the last IRA men to be so released. Neither the police nor MI5 ever discovered for certain what motivated Taylor to make the shift from English working-class politics to physical force Irish Republicanism, and the topic remains a subject of speculation.

== Political background ==
The IRA had been at war with the British government since the early 1970s and had carried out several bombing campaigns in England since. The department store Harrods had long been recognised as likely to be targeted; it was perceived as prestigious―particularly catering to the British upper class—and because of its high profile, attacks upon it guaranteed media coverage. On the day of the 1993 bombing the Evening Standard described how, "for the IRA, it is an irresistible target. One of the most instantly recognisable buildings in the world, to the terrorist it represents British class and privilege."

Harrods had already been bombed several times by the IRA. In 1974 it had been hit by the Balcombe Street gang, and then again in the 1983 bombing. Following that, commercial London had ceased to be targeted until 1992 when attacks on shops and tourism returned. A month before the 1993 Harrods bomb, the IRA exploded two bombs in litter bins outside the Wood Green Shopping City centre injuring four police officers and seven civilians on 10 December 1992. A week later on 17 December two more IRA bombs exploded in London outside shops injuring four people outside Littlewoods, Oxford Street and at Cavendish Square.

== Early life and career ==
British by birth to a working class, Anglican family in Bristol, Taylor had joined the British Army for his National Service in 1961. He ultimately reached the rank of corporal as a radio operator in the Royal Signal Corps. During an otherwise unremarkable military career he received a U.N. Peace Medal. Honourably discharged in 1973, he had served in Cyprus, Malta and Libya although not Northern Ireland.

== Political activism ==
Taylor had joined Sinn Féin's Kilburn cumann in 1970 and within six years was a member of its National Executive in England. In August that year Taylor was arrested during a protest outside Wormwood Scrubs high-security prison over inmates' conditions. A roof top protest had broken out, and Taylor was selling copies of An Phoblacht/Republican News in the crowd. Although he had regularly sold the paper outside the prison for several years previously, this time the Prevention of Terrorism Act (PTA) section 2.1(b) was invoked against him at his Horseferry Road hearing. As a result, Taylor joined the Trade Union Council Committee on the PTA.

Taylor was again arrested in November 1976 while protesting against a Peace People demonstration in London, where several protesters were assaulted by police. Charged at Bow Street Magistrates the following year with possessing an offensive weapon and a breach of the peace, he was fined £30 (equivalent to £176 in 2025) and bound over to keep the peace for three months. When Red Action was formed 1981 by members of the SWP―expelled for overly indulging in direct action politics—Taylor joined. (Note: Which the SWP termed "squaddism", or organised street fighting cadres.) The group was militantly anti-fascist, and engaged National Front members in running street battles. It was also in favour of physical force Republicanism and advocated on IRA issues; MI5 considered it subversive.

=== Calendar case ===
Taylor was arrested in December 1983 after selling one to an undercover officer for £1 (equivalent to £3 in 2025). These depicted commemorative dates, such as the 1981 Hunger Strikers' deaths what it called the "execution" of Lord Mountbatten, and colour images of IRA gunmen. Taylor was prosecuted under the Prevention of Terrorism Act 1974, which proscribed not just organisations suspected of terrorist activity against the UK, but also the public solicitation of support for them by individuals, whether themselves members or not. Taylor's was a test case on the ability of Republican groups to fundraise under the new law. He was charged with displaying the calendars "in a public place on October 28 in circumstances to arouse reasonable apprehension that he was a supporter of a proscribed organisation, the IRA".

The hearing, at which he was defended by Michael Mansfield, was held without a jury so as to deny him the opportunity for political grandstanding. Taylor, of Dron House, Adelina Grove, Stepney in East London, also admitted to selling badges, posters and newspapers, as well as similar calendars, every Friday night in that particular pub. He had been doing so, he said, since 1979. In his defence he also argued that the calendars possessed no overt indication that sales were in support of the IRA, and in any case, they were also being sold at Collet's Bookshop on Charing Cross Road. However, the magistrates judged the case to be "clearly proved" against him and that the "content of the calendar is explicit"; found guilty, on 9 May 1984, Taylor was fined £150 (equivalent to £489 in 2025).

== Later life ==
Taylor had several jobs following his army discharge. Having joined British Telecom (BT) as an engineer, since 1989 he had been stacking shelves on nights at Tesco. Colleagues from his time at BT later recalled him as a rabble rouser who often wore the badges of different left-wing causes. Although there is no direct evidence, security sources have suggested that during this period, he was building credit with the IRA, perhaps by hiding weapons or transporting vehicles. Although Taylor had become well known to MI5 for his involvement with Red Action and attendance at Troops Out demonstrations, he had joined the IRA by November 1992. By this time—and having partnered with Patrick Hayes, a university-educated and now unemployed computer programmer whom Taylor had known in Red Action―he had seemingly fallen out of the Security Service's view.

== Harrods bombing ==
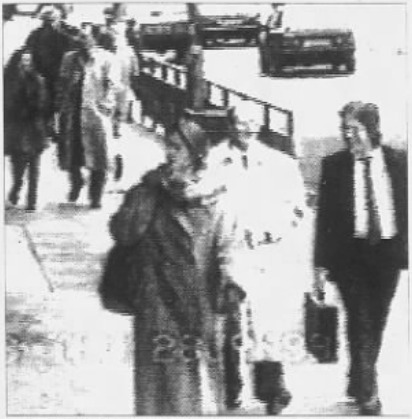
CCTV frame of Taylor and Hayes outside Harrods, 28 January 1993; the two men are on the far right, Taylor in the white mac, Hayes in the black jacket

On 28 January 1993, Taylor and Hayes were caught on CCTV dropping a package into a bin outside Harrods' Brompton Road entrance. The device—comprising 1 pound (0.45 kg) of semtex—exploded at 09:40. Four people were injured and surrounding plate glass windows—although nothing inside the building—suffered extensively. Approximately £1,000,000 (equivalent to £2,109,984 in 2025) in damage occurred. Taylor was described in news outlets later as looking "cheerful [and] middle-aged ... balding and wearing a light mac", looking like a businessman going to work. He may have been carrying a gun under his coat in case the operation was interrupted by the police.

Five weeks after the attack the Metropolitan Police decided to release a computer-enhanced version of the Harrods' CCTV footage. Although the police decision was considered a problematic tactic—it risked alerting the men and giving them time to disappear—in fact it led directly to their capture. Within hours of the footage's release, police had received information that identified one of the men as living at 52 Walford Road, Stoke Newington in northeast London.

=== Arrest ===
On 2 March, armed and undercover police surrounded what they now knew to be Hayes's flat in Stoke Newington where they waited for either man to return. Hayes arrived at 16:30, Taylor a couple of minutes later. It is thought he pair were intending to remove guns and explosives. Officers cordoned off the road before breaking in the front door as well as through a bay window at the back. Shots were fired at them at this point, albeit without effect. Taylor was found in the kitchen with an AK-47 and what appeared to be a bomb. He resisted arrest energetically but was subdued after being struck on the head with an officer's gun. Officers asked Taylor whether the bomb was primed, and although denied it, the building was immediately evacuated as a precaution until the bomb squad arrived. Taylor and Hayes were "overpowered, and bundled bleeding into vans" and taken to Paddington Green Police Station.

Also discovered in Walford Road was 22 pounds (10.0 kg) of semtex, ammonium nitrate, guns―including Kalashnikovs, a Walther P38 and a SLR rifle―a sock full of bullets, a list of London hotel toilets, bomb making paraphernalia―including detonators and booby trapped timers―and what was thought to be a hitlist. On this were named several senior Conservative Party politicians including Virginia Bottomley, then Health Secretary; also listed, with an accompanying photograph, was Stella Rimington, the Director General of MI5. (Note: Rimington had been the first Director General of MI5 to be publicly acknowledged by the government on her appointment in 1991.) Other targets included senior military officers, economic targets—such as the Stock Exchange and railway stations—and Conservative Central Office. The keys to a lock-up garage in Colney Hatch Lane, Muswell Hill, North London, led police to a major explosives cache. Personal effects included copies of Socialist Worker and An Phoblacht. Another paper found was that day's Evening Standard, which had run the enhanced CCTV photographs of the men under the headline "Wanted for Harrods Bomb". At the time of his arrest, Taylor was unmarried and still living in Adelina Grove, Stepney. When police searched the dwelling, they discovered his Peace Medal, with "IRA" written across it.

=== Hearings and trial ===
The day after his arrest, Taylor was arraigned at the high-security Arbour Square magistrates. All entrants to the court were searched, and both marksmen and a police helicopter covered the proceedings. They were remanded to maximum-security Belmarsh Prison. In April, at a subsequent hearing also in Arbour Square, Taylor appeared bare-foot and wearing only boxer shorts to protest the treatment of Category A prisoners in Belmarsh. Their solicitor, Gareth Pierce, told the court she faced lengthy delays―sometimes three weeks―before seeing her clients. The two were unable to speak to each other without a solicitor being present, the first time such a restriction had been imposed in the English justice system. The magistrate called these conditions "totally unacceptable". Both men argued that this had disadvantaged their ability to prepare a defence and that they would have to dismiss their barristers and represent themselves.

Taylor and his co-accused, Patrick Hayes, were tried before Mr Justice Hidden in May at the Old Bailey. Taylor instructed his counsel not to cross-examine on his behalf, nor gave evidence in his defence. Both men refused to plead, so "not guilty" was entered for them on the eight counts with which they were charged.

Apart from the Harrods bomb, Taylor was also linked to the possession of the fertiliser mix used in the preparation of two lorry bombs that had been found in Canary Wharf and Tottenham Court Road in November and December 1992. These were two of the IRA's biggest bombs yet; The Daily Telegraph called it "miraculous" that they failed to detonate. The prosecution also asserted that had the Tottenham Court Road bomb exploded as planned, it could have caused the greatest carnage the West End had ever seen. Other charges Taylor faced included conspiracy to cause explosions and conspiracy to endanger life prior to 2 March 1993, possession of unlicensed firearms and the attempted murder of Police Constable Philip Thorne during his arrest. Forensic evidence suggested Taylor planted the bomb which destroyed a Network SouthEast Victoria–Ramsgate train in February the same year. This operation had resulted in no casualties, but was condemned for its "misleading" telephone warning.

On Friday 13 May the two were found guilty on all counts. According to the Daily Telegraph they "smiled, laughed and nudged each other" during sentencing. They received 30 years each. Before he was taken down Taylor shook hands with Hayes, punched the air, shouted Republican slogans and saluted supporters in the public gallery.

== Imprisonment and release ==
In 1996 Taylor's case—along with those of 13 other IRA prisoners―was found to be potentially affected by a contaminated centrifuge at a government laboratory in Fort Halstead. This had misidentified the RDX compound in the Semtex analysis. In the event, the Home Secretary Michael Howard announced their convictions to be safe and not referable to the Court of Appeal.

Taylor's last English jail was Whitemoor Prison in Cambridgeshire. As part of the ongoing Irish peace process he was entitled to apply for transfer to an Irish jail. This he did in December 1998. His request was granted—along with that of Liam Quinn and Dingus Magee―just before Christmas. As such he served what remained of his sentence in Portlaoise Prison. (Note: Also flying to Baldonnel with Taylor were Michael Gallagher, Jimmy Murphy and Paddy Kelly; all had been born outside Ireland.) His transfer was at one point in doubt, in the words of the Irish Independent, "because he was not born here and was a member of the extreme left-wing group, Red Action". However, despite having no known links to the country, he was nonetheless repatriated on 18 December 1998. On Christmas Eve, he was released on five days' parole. Under the terms of the 1998 Good Friday Agreement he was eligible for early release. In the event, Taylor was among the last IRA prisoners to be released under the GFA. On Monday, 20 December 1999 he and eight other men left Castlerea Prison, County Roscommon, the last batch of prisoners to be so since the process had begun.

== Motivation ==
Despite the Security Service's knowledge of Taylor's Red Action background and support for Irish militancy, they never suspected or investigated him as being complicit in the 1993 London bombing campaign. The only evidence presented against them at trial was that collected by the Metropolitan Police and Special Branch. Even after his arrest, police discovered little as to his earlier life, except for what they had on record, and this prevented them from ever discovering how—or when—he went from overt political activity to covert military activity. Taylor made no statement following his arrest. The investigative reporter Tony Geraghty has described him as having begun his political career as a "weekend Socialist Worker" in the 1970s, yet having become a "fully fledged" volunteer by the 1990s. The writer Martin Dillon has called Taylor a sleeper, all the more dangerous because of his apparent lack of history.

Taylor was an atypical Irish Republic volunteer at this time, not only by being—as The Independent put it, "indisputably English"—but by having no visible antecedents in the movement. Indeed, it is thought that he had never even visited Ireland. As "born-and-bred Englishmen", explained a police officer after the trial, it was "almost without precedent ... by any objective analysis these people would not be considered as IRA suspects". Taylor was probably drawn to Irish Republicanism not through personal conviction, ancestry or sentimental nationalism but through revolutionary, political ideology. For their part, the IRA—who usually actively avoided English left-wing fellow travellers due to the ease with which those groups had been infiltrated―felt able to trust Taylor only after he had proved his loyalty and value to them with two decades' solidarity work.

== Citations ==
=== Works ===
- Boggan, S. (18 September 1996). "Doubt Over 14 IRA Convictions". The Independent. ISSN 1741-9743. OCLC 185201487.
- Brady, T. (16 January 1998). "Seven IRA Men in Jail Move and more to Follow". Irish Independent. ISSN 0021-1222.
- Brady, T. (5 May 1998a). "Two More Prisoners Seeking Transfer". Irish Independent. ISSN 0021-1222.
- Brady, T. (19 December 1998b). "INLA Eight Line up for Release". Irish Independent. ISSN 0021-1222.
- Brady, T.; Hogan, E. (23 December 1998). "Christmas Jail Gates Open for 20 IRA Men". Irish Independent. ISSN 0021-1222.
- Burrell, I. (18 December 1996). "IRA Jailings Safe despite Lab Errors". The Independent.
- Campbell, D. (14 May 1994). "English-born Bombers get 30 Years for 14 IRA Blasts". The Guardian. ISSN 0261-3077. OCLC 60623878.
- Campbell, D. (14 April 1994a). "English Pair 'Carried out IRA Bombings'". The Guardian. ISSN 0261-3077. OCLC 60623878.
- Chalk, P. (2013). Encyclopedia of Terrorism. Santa Barbara, CA: ABC-CLIO. ISBN 978-0-31338-535-3.
- Cheston, P. (9 May 1994). "Innocent Man Jailed for my IRA Lorry Bomb". Evening Standard. ISSN 2041-4404.
- Cheston, P. (13 May 1994a). "Harrods Bombers Jailed for 30 Years". Evening Standard. ISSN 2041-4404.
- Cheston, P.; Webb, G. (13 May 1994). "Harrods IRA Bombers are Jailed for 30 Years". Evening Standard. ISSN 2041-4404.
- Coles, T. J. (2018). Manufacturing Terrorism: When Governments Use Fear to Justify Foreign Wars and Control Society. Horsham: Clairview. ISBN 978-1-90557-097-3.
- Court Update (14 April 1994). "Police Feared IRA 'Bomb' was Armed". Evening Herald. ISSN 0791-6906.
- Court Updated (22 April 1993). "IRA Suspects Turn up in Boxer Shorts". Evening Herald. ISSN 0791-6906.
- Crime Rapporteur (10 May 1984). "Former Soldier Fined for Selling IRA Calendar". The Guardian. ISSN 0261-3077. OCLC 60623878.
- Delgado, M. (14 April 1994). "Standard Saved London". Evening Standard. ISSN 2041-4404.
- Dillon, M. (1998). 25 Years of Terror (repr. ed.). London: Bantam. ISBN 978-0-55340-773-0.
- Dobbie, P. (5 March 1993). "Harrods Bomb: Security Shield for Two in Court". Evening Standard. ISSN 2041-4404.
- Dooley, B. (2004). Choosing the Green?: Second Generation Irish and the Cause of Ireland. Dublin: Beyond the Pale. ISBN 978-1-90096-026-7.
- Geraghty, T. (2000). The Irish War: The Hidden Conflict Between the IRA and British Intelligence. London: Johns Hopkins University Press. ISBN 978-0-80186-456-8.
- Gilligan, A. (19 August 2018). "Police Examined Jeremy Corbyn Links to pro-IRA Group Red Action". The Times.
- Helsinki Watch (1991). Restricted Subjects: Freedom of Expression in the United Kingdom. New York: Human Rights Watch. ISBN 978-0-30005-624-2.
- Heraldic (15 July 1993). "Accused Bombers are sent for Trial". Evening Herald. ISSN 0791-6906.
- Hogan, E. (21 December 1999). "Last IRA Prisoners Freed under Pact". Irish Independent. ISSN 0021-1222.
- Home (4 April 1993). "Men Accused of Harrods Bomb face more Charges". The Independent. ISSN 1741-9743. OCLC 185201487.
- Howe, S. (2016). "Some Intellectual Origins of the Labour Left's Thought about Ireland, c.1979–97". In Marley, L. (ed.). The British Labour Party and Twentieth-century Ireland: The cause of Ireland, the Cause of Labour. Manchester: Manchester University Press. pp. 182–196. ISBN 978-1-78499-644-4.
- Johnston, P.; Steele, J. (25 April 1998). "Men of Violence sent back to Irish Prisons". The Daily Telegraph. ISSN 0307-1235. OCLC 49632006.
- Kuerbitz, R. J. (1988). "The Bombing of Harrods: Norms against Civilian Targeting". In Reisman, W. M.; Willard, A. R. (eds.). International Incidents: The Law That Counts in World Politics. Princeton: Princeton University Press. pp. 238―262. ISBN 978-1-40085-948-1.
- London Court News (23 April 1993). "Protest on Curbs on Bombing Suspects". Irish Independent. ISSN 0021-1222.
- London News (13 May 1993). "Suspects Threaten to Dismiss Solicitor". Evening Herald. ISSN 0791-6906.
- London News (16 July 1993a). "Harrods Bomb: Two Sent for Trial". Irish Independent. ISSN 0021-1222.
- London News (5 May 1994). "Accused Bombers Offer no Evidence". Evening Herald. ISSN 0791-6906.
- Machon, A. (2005). Spies, Lies and Whistleblowers: MI5, MI6 and the Shayler Affair. Lewes: Book Guild. ISBN 978-1-85776-952-4.
- Major, P.; Moran, C. R. (2009). Spooked: Britain, Empire and Intelligence since 1945. Durham: Cambridge Scholars Publishing. ISBN 978-1-52755-326-2.
- Miller, A. H. (2006). "Preserving Liberty in a Society under Siege: The Media and the Guildford Four". In Rapoport, D. C. (ed.). Terrorism: The Third or New Left Wave. Abingdon: Routledge. pp. 236―253. ISBN 978-0-41531-653-8.
- Miller, D.; Jackson, P.; Thrift, N.; Holbrook, B.; Rowlands, M. (1998). Shopping, Place and Identity. Abingdon: Routledge. ISBN 978-1-13473-392-7.
- McGladdery, G. (2006). The Provisional IRA in England: The Bombing Campaign, 1973-1997. Dublin: Irish Academic. ISBN 978-0-71653-374-0.
- McGowan, P. (14 February 1996). "Computer Experts Search for Clues in Bombers Video". Evening Standard. ISSN 2041-4404.
- Mickolus, E. F.; Simmons, S. L. (1997). Terrorism, 1992-1995: A Chronology of Events and a Selectively Annotated Bibliography. Westport: Greenwood. ISBN 978-0-31330-468-2.
- News in Brief (16 July 1993). "Bomb Charge Case". The Guardian. ISSN 0261-3077. OCLC 60623878.
- O'Donnell, R. (2015). Special Category: The IRA in English Prisons II: 1978-1985. Dublin: Merrion Press. ISBN 978-0-71653-316-0.
- O'Neill, S. (23 April 1993). "Irish Inquest Soldiers Lose Protection of Identities". The Daily Telegraph. ISSN 0307-1235. OCLC 49632006.
- Passmore, J. (28 January 1993). "British Class Symbol Bombers can't Resist". Evening Standard. ISSN 2041-4404.
- Steele, J. (14 April 1994). "English Pair Accused of Bombing Harrods". The Daily Telegraph. ISSN 0307-1235. OCLC 49632006.
- Steele, J. (16 April 1994a). "IRA Bomb Fault 'Saved Crowds from Slaughter'". The Daily Telegraph. ISSN 0307-1235. OCLC 49632006.
- Steele, J. (10 May 1994b). "I Drove the Lorry Bomb, IRA Suspect tells Court". The Daily Telegraph. ISSN 0307-1235. OCLC 49632006.
- Steele, J. (14 May 1994c). "English Terrorists who Launched "Wicked" IRA Bomb Campaign are Jailed for 30 Years". The Daily Telegraph. ISSN 0307-1235. OCLC 49632006.
- Walker, C. (1992). The Prevention of Terrorism in British Law. Manchester: Manchester University Press. ISBN 978-0-71903-176-2.
- Walker, C. (2015). "Championing Local Surveillance in Counter-terrorism". In Davis, F.; McGarrity, N.; Williams, G. (eds.). Surveillance, Counter-Terrorism and Comparative Constitutionalism. London: Routledge. pp. 23–41. ISBN 978-1-13409-534-6.
- Walker, C.; McKay, S. (2015). "Community Surveillance and Terrorism". In Pearse, J. (ed.). Investigating Terrorism: Current Political, Legal and Psychological Issues. Oxford: John Wiley. pp. 214–238. ISBN 978-1-11999-416-9.
- Seaton, M. (29 January 1995). "Charge of the New Red Brigade". The Independent.
- Today's Weather (10 February 1984). "IRA Calandar: Man Fined". Irish Independent. ISSN 0021-1222.
- Urban, M. (1996). UK Eyes Alpha. London: Faber & Faber. ISBN 978-0-57126-669-2.
- Ward, S. (13 April 1994). "'Proud' IRA Bombers Jailed for 30 Years". The Independent.
- Ward, S. (16 April 1994a). "Court told of Booby Trap on IRA Van Bomb". The Independent. ISSN 1741-9743. OCLC 185201487.
- Wilson, R.; Adams, T. (2015). Special Branch: A History: 1883-2006. London: Biteback. ISBN 978-1-84954-963-9.
