= Heathrow mortar attacks =

1994 IRA attacks in London, England

1994 Heathrow mortar attacks
- Part of The Troubles
- Location: Heathrow Airport, London, England, UK
- Date: First attack 9 March 1994; Second attack 11 March 1994; Third attack 13 March 1994 (GMT)
- Target: Heathrow Airport
- Attack type: Mortar barrage
- Deaths: 0
- Injuries: 0
- Perpetrator: Provisional IRA
- Motive: Irish republicanism

The 1994 Heathrow mortar attacks were a series of homemade mortar bomb attacks targeted at Heathrow Airport carried out by the Provisional IRA. Over a five-day period, Heathrow was targeted three times (9, 11, and 13 March) by the IRA, which fired 12 mortar rounds. Heathrow was a symbolic target due to its importance to the United Kingdom's economy, and much disruption was caused when areas of the airport were closed over the period due to the IRA attacks. The gravity of the incident was heightened by the fact that Queen Elizabeth II was being flown back to Heathrow by the RAF on 10 March.

== Background ==
The Provisional IRA had first attacked Great Britain in March 1973 with car bombs in London which injured over 200 people. Beginning in October 1974 the IRA launched a sustained bombing campaign in England which lasted until December 1975 when the IRA unit responsible was arrested after the Balcombe Street Siege

Thereafter the IRA launched more sporadic but more spectacular attacks on Britain which generated worldwide publicity like the Hyde Park and Regent's Park bombings and an attempt to kill the then British Prime Minister Margaret Thatcher with the 1984 Brighton bombing. The early 1990's seen a renewed bombing campaign in England, however unlike in the 1970s this was aimed more at economic targets, such as the April 1992 Baltic Exchange bombing which resulted in insurance claims amounted to £800 million. As a comparison, the estimated figure for the whole of Northern Ireland since the start of the conflict back in 1969 until then was £615 million. Almost a year later the 1993 Bishopsgate bombing killed one man and injured over 30 people in the explosion. Later estimates put the cost of repair for the Bishopsgate bomb at £350 million (some initial reported estimates were as high as £1 billion).

The IRA launched its first mortar attack in mainland Britain on 7 February 1991 during the Downing Street mortar attack, which was an attempt to assassinate Prime Minister John Major and his War Cabinet, who were meeting to discuss the Gulf War. One of the heavy mortar shells exploded in the back garden of number 10, only yards from the cabinet office. Due to the bomb-proof windows, none of the cabinet were hurt, though four other people received minor injuries, including two police officers. The other two shells overshot Downing Street and landed on a green nearby.

== Attacks ==
The first Heathrow attack was carried out on 9 March at 6.00 pm. In this attack the IRA fired five Mark-6 mortar rounds into the grounds of Heathrow Airport from a parked car. None of these exploded, and a search by security officers found no signs of further trouble. Queen Elizabeth II was due to arrive at Heathrow the next day being flown by the Royal Air Force. Despite being given a one-hour warning that bombs would explode at the airport, police did not close Heathrow's northern runway even after it was targeted by mortar bombs. A British Airways airliner to Copenhagen used the runway two minutes before the attack was launched from the car park of the Forte Excelsior Hotel, about 400 meters (440 yd) away, at 5.57 pm.

The second of the three attacks was carried out on 11 March when the IRA launched a further four mortar rounds from a wooded area. The projectiles again did not explode. The Queen's plane landed while a further search was under way.

In the third and final attack on 13 March, with mortars that again failed to explode landing inside the airport grounds. They had been buried and the launch tubes were missed in previous searches. The airport was closed for two hours afterwards. In a statement issued later that day, the IRA stated their "positive and flexible" attitude to the peace process was "abiding and enduring".

According to one of the men involved in the attacks, the mortars were designed not to explode: the attack was a "purely symbolic" protest against the renewal of the Prevention of Terrorism Act.

== Aftermath ==
No one was injured in the attacks using what the police called 'home made' devices, but flights were disrupted and Terminal One was closed as bomb disposal experts searched for any remaining devices after each attack.

The shelling of Heathrow was apparently intended to put pressure on the British government to go beyond the Downing Street Declaration. Irish Taioseach Albert Reynolds dubbed the attacks as "political naive", regarding the presumed IRA goal of extracting more concessions. The IRA and Sinn Féin wanted an unequivocal signal from Britain that they would open the way to full scale negotiations, with a defined time span and an open agenda.

In 1998 Michael Gallagher, who had provided the attackers with transportation and rented the garage where the explosives were prepared, was sentenced to 20 years in prison for conspiracy to cause explosions. Gallagher was released from prison in 2000 under the Good Friday Agreement and later published a memoir, Unbroken: Secrets, Lies and Enduring Love, which detailed his role in the attacks.

This was the last major attack in Britain before the IRA's 1994 ceasefire and until the 1996 Docklands bombing, which ended it.

== See also ==
- 1984 Heathrow Airport bombing
- Downing Street mortar attack
- 1996 Docklands bombing
