= Staples Corner =

Road junction in London

Coordinates: 51.5718°N 0.2287°W

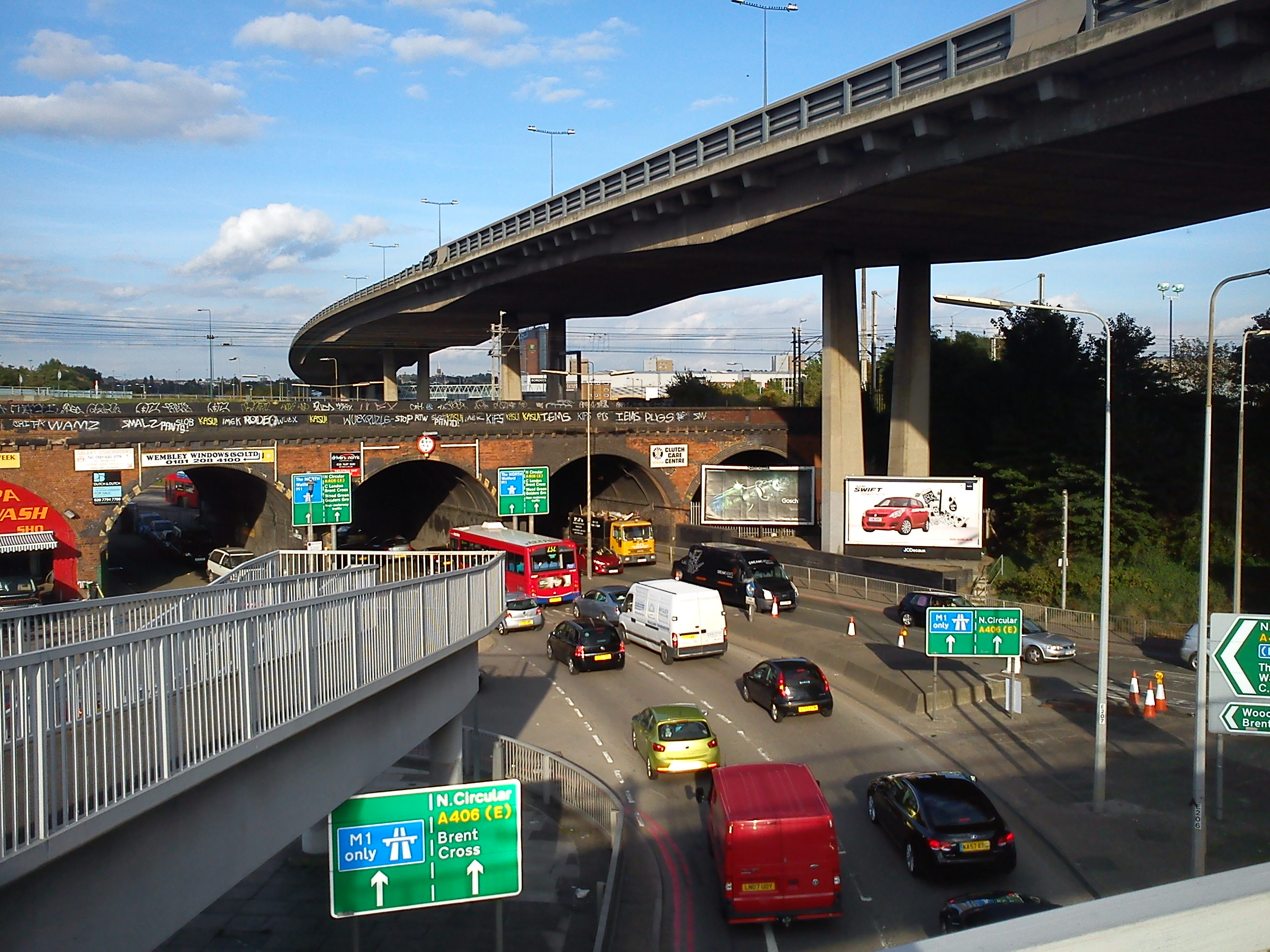
View eastwards

Staples Corner is a major road junction in London, United Kingdom. It is about 6.3 miles (10.1 km) north-west from Charing Cross and directly to the west of the Brent Cross crossover. It is within the Brent Cross Cricklewood new town.

It has two linked roundabouts and flyovers, which connect the A406 North Circular Road with the A5 Edgware Road and the start of the M1 motorway. Also running through Staples Corner, between the two roundabouts, is the Midland Main Line and Thameslink railway line.

Since 10 December 2023, it is served by Brent Cross West railway station.

== Construction ==
The Staples Corner junction was built in accordance with plans from the 1960s to continue the M1 further south to West Hampstead. These proposals, part of the London Ringways Plan, would have seen a three level junction with the M1 as the middle level crossing above the roundabout on a flyover and passing under the A406 flyover. South of the junction the motorway would have headed through Cricklewood on an elevated roadway to meet the North Cross Route section of the London Motorway Box (Ringway 1) at an elevated Y-shaped junction. Most of the Ringways Plan including the North Cross Route was cancelled in 1973. The A406 flyover opened on 18 August 1976.

Staples Corner is named after the Staples Mattress factory, which was at the road junction from 1926 to 1986. Harold Heal commissioned the designing and building of the factory.

== Incidents ==
On 28 October 1988, two Up (southbound) Class 31 (31202 and 31226) locomotives rolled off together from Cricklewood depot together along a short siding and after demolishing the buffer stop they ran down the embankment on to the North Circular Road, although nobody was hurt. The second loco of the pair landed on the roof of the leading one, remaining precariously balanced. They were both withdrawn after the incident. The locomotives were unmanned, with the cause of the incident being a failure to apply brakes correctly.

On 11 April 1992, a Provisional IRA 100 lb van bomb devastated Staples Corner, causing serious damage to roads and nearby buildings and the closure of the junction (see 1992 Staples Corner bombing). Another bomb exploded near the junction on 8 October 1993, causing damage but no injuries.

The B&Q DIY store damaged by the bomb (on the site of the original mattress factory) was demolished, and replaced by a branch of Staples office supplies. Staples stayed at the site until 2017, when the retailer closed all its UK physical stores. There is a large retail park at Staples Corner, located between the A5 and the railway line. Close by is the Brent Cross Shopping Centre, named after the A406 and A41 road junction.

The format of the Staples Corner junction was modified during the reconstruction works necessitated by the bombings. An additional sliproad onto the M1 from the east was added to remove the need for traffic coming from that direction to travel around the roundabout to access the motorway.

== Redevelopment ==
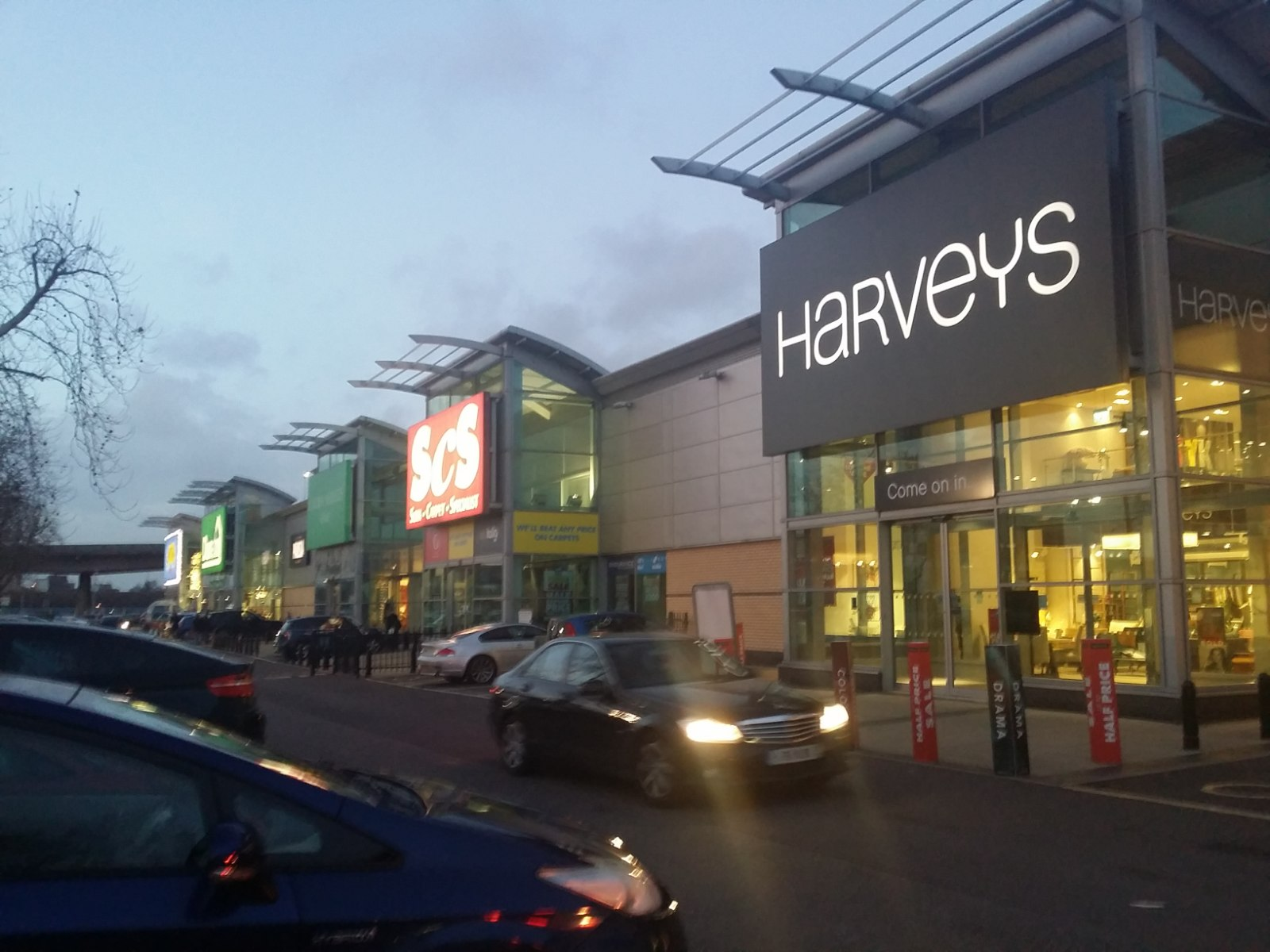
Staples Corner Retail Park, located next to the gyratory

In early 2008, a planning application was submitted to develop the Brent Cross area into a new town centre, on both sides of the North Circular Road. The Staples Corner junction would be completely redesigned, with no south-bound A5 to west-bound North Circular Road travel, and no east-bound North Circular to south-bound A5 travel possible, except by using new roads at the eastern side of the M1 motorway junction.
