= 1984 Heathrow Airport bombing =

Terrorist attack

Coordinates: 51°28′12″N 0°27′1″W

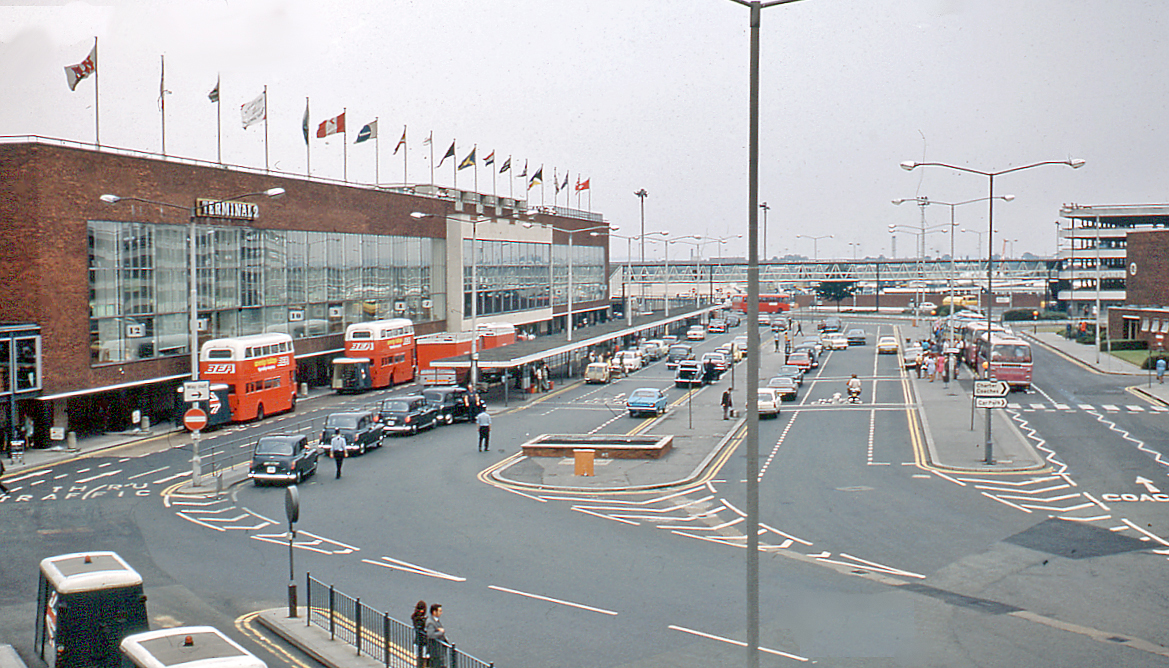
- Heathrow Terminal 2
- Location: Heathrow Airport, England, United Kingdom
- Date: 20 April 1984; 7:55 pm (GMT)
- Target: Heathrow Airport
- Attack type: Time bomb
- Deaths: 0
- Injuries: 23

The Heathrow Airport bombing occurred on 20 April 1984, when a bomb exploded in the baggage area of Terminal 2 at Heathrow Airport. The bomb exploded at 7:55 pm and injured 23 people. Commander William Hucklesby, at the time head of Scotland Yard's anti-terror branch, reported that the detonated device was constructed using two pounds (910 g) of commercial or military grade explosives. A hospital spokesperson stated that all but five victims were released shortly after being treated for minor scrapes, cuts, and bruises.

Sixty people were inside the baggage area when the bomb exploded. The blast injured 23, one seriously. The Angry Brigade, a British anarchist group, claimed responsibility for the bombing. British officials dismissed the claim, and instead pointed their fingers at "Libyan-related Arab groups". The bombing took place just three days after the murder of Yvonne Fletcher and wounding of 11 anti-Gaddafi demonstrators in the street by machine gun fire from the Libyan Embassy in London. Libyan Arab Airlines used Terminal 2 for its flights into London Heathrow, which raised suspicion as to whether the two events were related. Scotland Yard investigators said that no planes had arrived from Tripoli, with the most recent being around noon, eight hours prior to the detonation. The detonation was pinpointed to a storage facility for unclaimed baggage and bags that were to be rerouted to the correct destination. Explosive-detecting K9 units were dispatched to other parts of the airport, but no other explosives were found.

John MacIntyre, a British customs official stationed in Terminal 2 when the detonation occurred, told The New York Times:

There was a bloody big flash, a bang, and lots of smoke. I saw a British Airways bloke with blood all over the back of his shirt. There was an Iberian Airways lost-baggage representative as well. He didn't seem to have any blood on him but he was soaking wet. I gathered the central heating unit had blown up or the pipes had burst.
