= Sussex Arms pub bombing =

1992 Provisional IRA attack on London

Coordinates: 51.5121°N 0.1268°W

- Part of the Troubles
- Location: Sussex Arms, Long Acre, Covent Garden, City of Westminster, London, United Kingdom
- Date: 12 October 1992; 13:30 (UTC)
- Attack type: Bomb
- Deaths: 1
- Injuries: 7
- Perpetrator: Provisional Irish Republican Army

On 12 October 1992, the Provisional Irish Republican Army (IRA) detonated a bomb that had been planted in the gents' toilets in the Sussex Arms pub in Upper St Martins Lane near Long Acre, London, killing a man and injuring seven other people.

A telephone call to a radio station was made at 1:21 pm, nine minutes before the bomb exploded, saying a bomb had been placed "in the Leicester Square area"; a tourist-frequented spot nearby.

The bomb exploded at 1:30pm, injuring eight people. One of the wounded – thirty-year-old nurse David Heffer – died from his injuries in hospital. It was the eighth IRA bomb in London in a six-day period.

== See also ==
- Chronology of Provisional Irish Republican Army actions (1992–1999)
