= 1993 Camden Town bombing =

IRA attack in, London, England

- Part of the Troubles
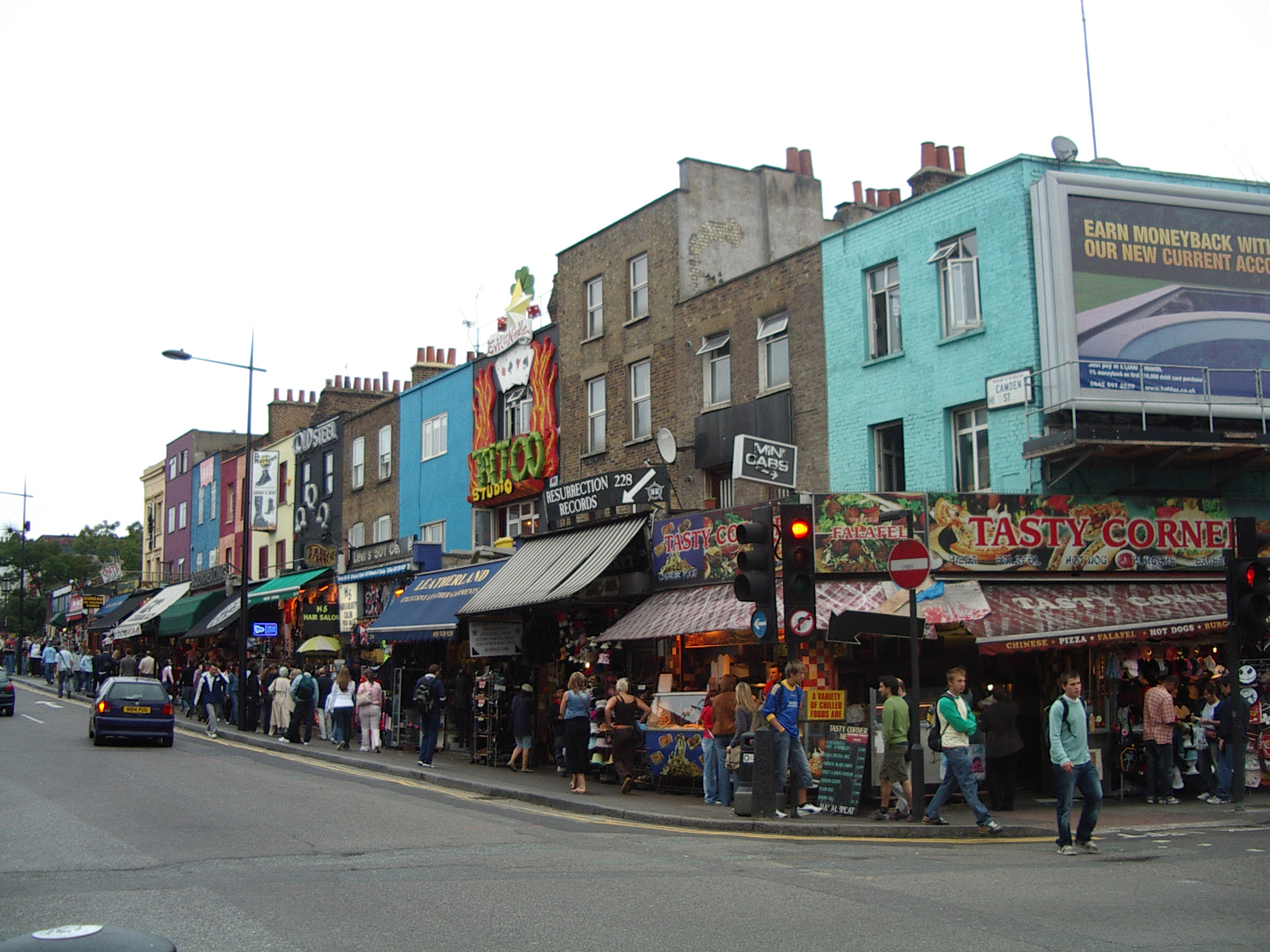
- Camden High Street in 2005
- Location: Camden Town, London, United Kingdom
- Date: 27 February 1993; 12:52 (UTC)
- Target: Camden High Street
- Attack type: Bomb
- Deaths: 0
- Injuries: 18
- Perpetrator: Provisional Irish Republican Army

The 1993 Camden Town bombing occurred on 27 February 1993, when a bomb exploded in Camden High Street, London, injuring 18 people. The Provisional IRA was responsible, planting the explosive in a litter bin and targeting people on the busiest day of the week, Saturday, after midday. One of the injured was Swedish tourist Jennie Erikson, 22. The IRA gave a coded telephone warning that a bomb was planted at a Kentucky Fried Chicken fast food store in the north end of High Street, near Camden Lock Market. Police unknowingly moved people towards the bomb's path in the south end 400 yards away. Scotland Yard chief Bernard Luckhurst said the misleading warnings of the bomb were "clearly designed" to kill or injure as many as it could.

Earlier the IRA sent a warning about a bomb in Oxford Street, which also had to be evacuated by police. The attack occurred a day after the Warrington bomb attacks.

== See also ==
- Chronology of Provisional Irish Republican Army actions (1992–1999)
- 1993 Harrods bombing
