= Bombings of Paddington and Victoria stations =

1991 IRA bombings in London

- Part of The Troubles
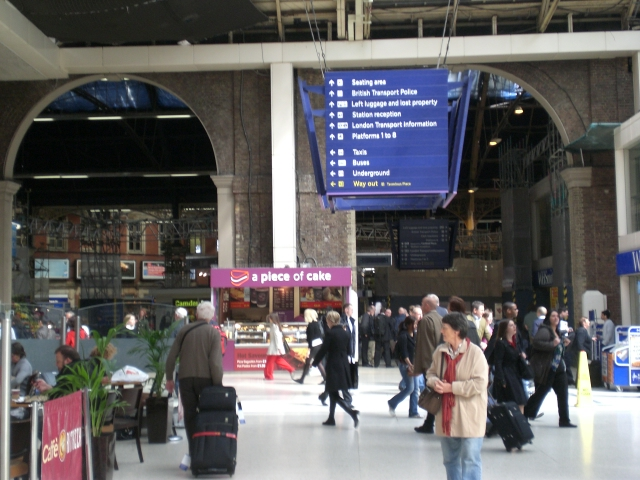
- Inside London Victoria railway station
- Location: London Victoria station, London Paddington station, London, England
- Date: 18 February 1991; Paddington station 4:20am Victoria station 7:40am GMT (GMT)
- Target: British Rail stations
- Attack type: Time bomb
- Deaths: 1
- Injuries: 38
- Perpetrator: Provisional Irish Republican Army

On 18 February 1991 two Provisional Irish Republican Army (IRA) bombs exploded at London mainline stations, one at Victoria station and the other at Paddington station, killing one person and injuring 38 other people at Victoria station. It was the IRA's second major attack in London in February 1991 after the Downing Street mortar attack eleven days earlier which was an attempt to assassinate the British War cabinet and the British prime minister John Major. It was also the first IRA attack against a civilian target in England since the 1983 Harrods bombing, marking a strategic change in their bombing campaign in England.

== Background ==
The IRA had stepped up their campaign against British military, economic and transport targets outside of Northern Ireland in the late 1980s. On 20 July 1990 the IRA detonated a large bomb at the London Stock Exchange causing massive damage but no injuries. Ten days later they killed Conservative MP Ian Gow.

=== Previous bombings of the stations ===
On 26 February 1884, at Victoria station, an explosion occurred in the cloakroom of the Brighton side injuring seven staff members, as part of the Fenian dynamite campaign.

On 26 July 1939 bombs exploded in the cloakroom of Victoria stations. At Victoria, five people, cloakroom attendants and porters, were wounded and the station clock was shattered.

On 8 September 1973, an IRA bomb exploded at the ticket office in Victoria station, injuring five people.

== The bombings ==
The Paddington station bomb went off at 4:20 am. There were no deaths or injuries, but the roof was badly damaged. The bomb at Paddington was designed to establish credibility for a subsequent IRA call warning that bombs would explode at all 11 mainline stations in London during the morning rush hour. The IRA intended that the security services would take the warning seriously and not treat it as a hoax. Given that an evacuation of this magnitude was unprecedented, the police hesitated before halting all incoming trains and evacuating every station, which would have put thousands of people on the streets, which may have been the location of secondary devices.

Sometime before 7:00 am, a caller with an Irish accent said: "We are the Irish Republican Army. Bombs to go off in all mainline stations in 45 minutes." Before ordering a massive evacuation, the authorities tried to search the stations. As a result, The Victoria station bomb, which was hidden in a rubbish bin inside the station, went off at 7:40 am whilst passengers were still present on crowded platforms. Despite a 45-minute warning and the Paddington bomb three hours before, which was much smaller than that at Victoria, the security services were slow to act. The bomb killed one person instantly and 38 others were injured by flying glass and other debris. This was the worst attack suffered by civilians in England at the hands of the IRA since the 1983 Harrods bombing, which killed three policemen, three civilians and injured 50 people. Fearing further casualties, for the first time in history, all London's rail terminals were closed, disrupting the journeys of almost half a million commuters and bringing chaos to London, which was the IRA's intended goal. There was also a hoax call made to Heathrow, causing the airport's closure.

That night the IRA claimed responsibility for the bombings but blamed the British police for the casualties. A statement from the IRA GHQ said: "The cynical decision of senior security personnel not to evacuate railway stations named in secondary warnings, even three hours after the warning device had exploded at Paddington in the early hours of this morning was directly responsible for the casualties at Victoria." The statement went on, "All future warnings should be acted upon."

Police defended the decision not to close all stations after receiving warning that bombs had been planted. Commander George Churchill-Coleman, head of Scotland Yard's anti-terrorist squad, said that dozens of hoax calls were received every day. "It is very easy with hindsight to be critical." Churchill-Coleman also said that the bomb was "quite deliberately intended to maim and kill."

== Aftermath ==
The Home Secretary, Kenneth Baker, visited Victoria station after the bomb and said "The concourse of Victoria is covered in blood. This is the act of murderous criminals." The Queen, and other officials, also sent their condolences to the victims.

This bombing would mark the IRA's shift to targeting civilian areas following the July 1990 London Stock Exchange bombing – something they had not done since the 1983 Harrods bombing. It was also the first IRA attack on the London transport system since 1976. The IRA kept bombing targets in England for the remainder of the year – dozens of bombs went off in the run up to Christmas 1991.

== Design of Public Transportation Infrastructure and Operations ==
The attack emphasized the need for increased public transportation security. Security measures for surface transportation cannot replicate those in place for aviation security: In addition to cost, other considerations include the volume of passengers, configuration and access points and concerns that enhanced security could increase vulnerability to attack e.g. increased crowding or queuing, thus "net security benefit" is the focus.

Following the attack, transportation designers and planners took pragmatic steps and adapted the way that stations and rolling stock were designed and managed in order to discourage attacks, mitigate the effects of an attack, and facilitate rapid recovery of service post-attack.

== See also ==
- Chronology of Provisional Irish Republican Army actions (1990–1991)
- Bombings of King's Cross and Euston stations
- Cannon Street train bombing
- Parsons Green bombing
