= 1992 London Bridge bombing =

Provisional IRA attack in London

London Bridge station bombing
- Part of the Troubles
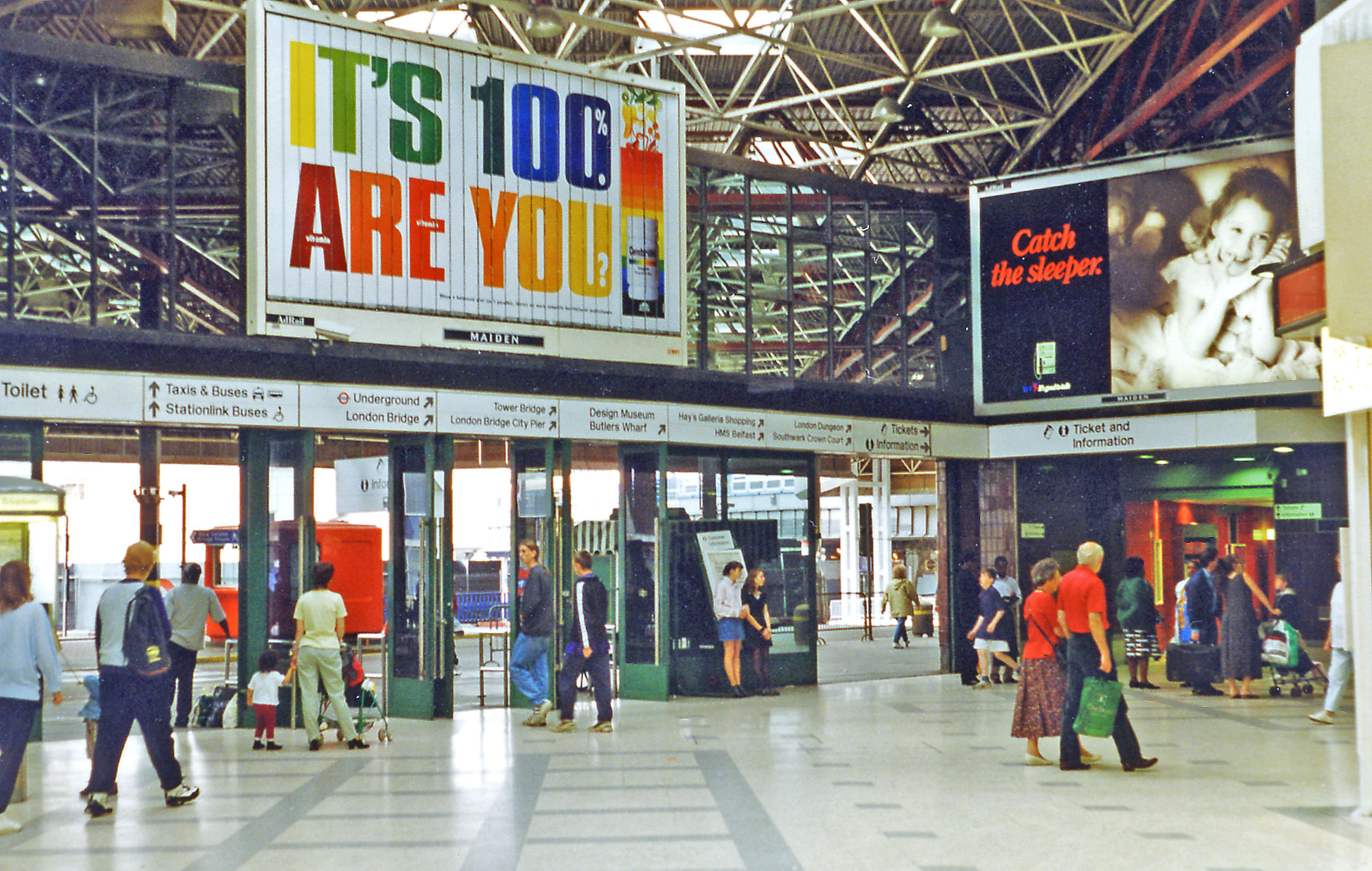
- London Bridge station interior, 1996
- Location: London, England
- Date: 28 February 1992; 8:30 am GMT (UTC)
- Attack type: Time bomb
- Deaths: 0
- Injuries: 29
- Perpetrator: Provisional Irish Republican Army

On Friday 28 February 1992, the Provisional IRA (IRA) exploded a bomb inside London Bridge station during the morning rush hour, causing extensive damage and wounding 29 people. It was one of many bombings carried out by one of the IRA's London active service units. It occurred just over a year after a bomb at Victoria station.

== Bombing ==
Around 8:20 am, someone rang Ulster Television's London office warning that a bomb was going to explode in a London station, without saying which one. About ten minutes later, the bomb detonated, which made debris fly almost 50 feet (15 m) away from the blast area. Twenty nine people were hurt in the explosion, most of them from flying glass and other bits of debris; four were seriously hurt but nobody was killed. The victims were treated at Guy's Hospital.

== Aftermath ==
The head of Scotland Yard's anti terrorist squad, George Churchill-Coleman, said the 2 lb (910 g) bomb of high explosives was "clearly designed to kill." Investigations suggested that the bomb was placed in the men's restrooms. Churchill-Coleman added that the IRA's warning was "deliberately vague" and was given too late to act upon.

Prime Minister John Major said the bombing would not change British policy in Northern Ireland. "It was pointless. It was cowardly. It was directed against innocent people and it will make absolutely no difference to our policy -- no difference at all."

The next day, another bomb went off in London, by the Crown Prosecution Service office, injuring two more people and bringing the total injured to 31 in the space of just over 24 hours.

This was one of dozens of bombs that detonated in London that year, the biggest of which was the Baltic Exchange bombing, killing three people and causing almost £1 billion worth of damage. The IRA maintained this pressure, bombing mainland Britain and especially the city of London as much as possible until the ceasefire of 1994.

== See also ==
- Chronology of Provisional Irish Republican Army actions (1992–1999)
- Victoria station and Paddington station bombings
- Cannon Street train bombing
