= 1993 Harrods bombing =

IRA attack in London, England

Coordinates: 51°29′59″N 00°09′49″W

- Part of the Troubles
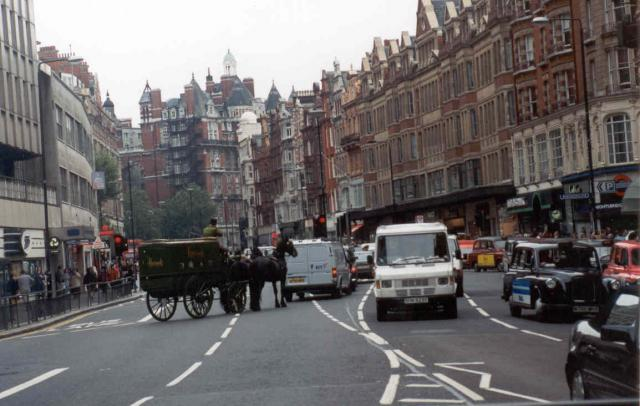
- Brompton Road, looking north from Harrods in 1993
- Location: Knightsbridge, London, United Kingdom
- Date: 28 January 1993; 09:40 (UTC)
- Target: Harrods
- Attack type: Bomb
- Deaths: 0
- Injuries: 4
- Perpetrator: Provisional Irish Republican Army

The 1993 Harrods bombing occurred on 28 January 1993 when a bomb exploded near the Harrods department store in London, England.

== Background ==
The Provisional IRA began intensifying its bombings in London in 1992. A month before the Harrods bomb, on 10 December 1992 the IRA exploded two bombs in litter bins outside the Wood Green Shopping City centre injuring four police officers and seven civilians. A week later on 17 December two more IRA bombs exploded in London outside shops injuring four people at Oxford Street and Cavendish Square.

== Bombing ==
On 28 January 1993 a bomb exploded near the Harrods department store in London, England. At 9:14, two telephoned warnings were issued, saying that two bombs had been planted: one outside and one inside Harrods. The store was due to open at 10:00. Police cordoned off the area and began a search. However, some bystanders ignored the police cordon. At about 9:40, a package containing 1 lb (450 g) of Semtex exploded in a litter bin at the front of the store. It injured four people and damaged the shopfront. The cost of damage and lost sales was estimated at £1 million.

Harrods was previously targeted by the IRA before, first two firebombs in August 1973 caused minor damage, in 1974 the IRA's active service unit known as the Balcombe Street Gang exploded another firebomb gutting a clothes shop inside the store and injuring one member of staff and in 1983 a car bomb killed six (3 civilians and 3 police) and injured 90 people, the 1993 bomb was much smaller than the 1983 one.

== Perpetrators ==
Those responsible were English Irish nationalist activists associated with the Provisional IRA: Jan Taylor, a 51-year-old former corporal who had served in the British Army Royal Signals Corps, and Patrick Hayes, a 41-year-old computer programmer of Irish descent, with a degree in business studies from Polytechnic of Central London and a member of Red Action.

In March 1993, police captured them at Hayes' home in Stoke Newington, London. They each received prison sentences of 30 years for the January Harrods bombing and for a second attack on a train a month later which caused extensive damage but no casualties. Hayes was also convicted of conspiracy to cause three additional explosions in 1992. Neither man had any apparent links to Ireland beyond their "unswerving support for the IRA". Both were released in 1999 under the Good Friday Agreement.

== See also ==
- Chronology of Provisional Irish Republican Army actions (1992–1999)
- Harrods bombing (1983)
- Oxford Street bombing (1974)
- Stoke Newington Road lorry bomb (1992)
- 1993 Camden Town bombing
- 1993 Bishopsgate bombing
- Warrington bombings (1993)
