= 1992 Staples Corner bombing =

Provisional IRA attack on London

Coordinates: 51.5718°N 0.2287°W

- Part of the Troubles
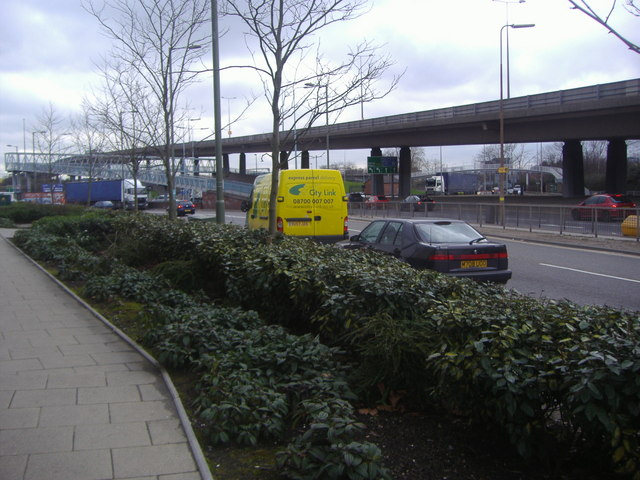
- The North Circular Road flyover from Tilling Road, looking towards Staples Corner
- Location: Staples Corner, London, United Kingdom
- Date: 11 April 1992; 1:10am (UTC)
- Attack type: Van bomb
- Deaths: 0
- Injuries: 0
- Perpetrator: Provisional Irish Republican Army

The 1992 Staples Corner bombing occurred on 11 April 1992 when the Provisional IRA detonated a large van bomb near the Staples Corner junction in North West London, England.

== Description ==
The attack happened at 1:10 am, a few hours after the major bombing of the Baltic Exchange seven miles away which killed three people. The bomb was home-made like the Baltic Exchange one, and was placed in a white Bedford van. The IRA gave telephone warnings 50 minutes prior from a phone operator in Portadown, Northern Ireland. Police located the van and evacuated the area.

Although no injuries were caused, the blast was powerful and caused significant damage to roads, leaving a crater on the A5 Edgware Road flyover beneath the North Circular Road. It was strong enough to be felt several miles away. The bomb damaged a three-storey B&Q DIY superstore and a steel-framed warehouse, and severely damaged warehouse property constructed of light cladding. It was estimated the explosive force was around 100 kg. An eyewitness said the B&Q store was "completely destroyed" and the roof collapsed.

== Aftermath ==
The B&Q superstore had to be demolished and the junction was closed for several months, causing severe disruption. It is one of London's busiest intersections as it forms the lead of the M1 motorway.

On the morning of 8 October 1993, the IRA targeted Staples Corner once again with a small explosion. Around the same time another bomb detonated 2 miles away on West End Lane in West Hampstead. No injuries were caused. In 1994 two IRA members, Gerard Mackin and Derek Doherty, were found guilty of planting 12 bombs throughout London over seven days in October 1993.

== In popular culture ==
Staples Corner is featured in Patrick Keiller's 1994 film London. The scene showcases the wreckage of the bombing days after the explosion in 1992.

== See also ==
- Chronology of Provisional Irish Republican Army actions (1992–1999)
- Baltic Exchange bombing
