= Culverhouse =

Culverhouse is an English topographic surname, which originally meaning a person who tended or lived near a dovecote, derived from the Old English culfrehus ("dovecote"). Dovecotes were common on English estates in the medieval period. The name may refer to:

- Gay Culverhouse (1947–2020), American academic administrator
- Hugh Culverhouse (1919–1994), American lawyer and NFL team owner
- Ian Culverhouse (born 1964), English footballer
- Mike Culverhouse (born 1951), British police officer
