= UKIP: The First 100 Days =

- Promotional image with Priyanga Burford as the fictional Deepa Kaur, MP
- Directed by: Chris Atkins
- Starring: Priyanga Burford
- Country of origin: United Kingdom
- Original language: English

Production
- Running time: 60 mins (including commercials)

Original release
- Network: Channel 4
- Release: 16 February 2015

UKIP: The First 100 Days is a 2015 mockumentary which was broadcast on Channel 4 in the United Kingdom on 16 February 2015, a few months before the May 2015 general election. It tells the fictional story of how the country would be run if the UK Independence Party (UKIP), a Eurosceptic party, were to win the election and leader Nigel Farage becoming Prime Minister. The programme is filmed in the style of a Fly on the wall documentary that follows UKIP's fictional first female Asian MP as she struggles with the party's stance on immigration amid mounting public discontent with its hardline policies. The role of Deepa Kaur, who is elected to serve as MP for the Romford constituency, is played by Priyanga Burford.

Details of the programme with the working title 100 Days of UKIP were announced in October 2014. Within a day of the programme airing, over 1,000 complaints were lodged with Ofcom and Channel 4, reaching to over 5,000 complaints in a week to Ofcom and a further thousand to Channel 4, prompting the broadcasting regulator to open an investigation. In February 2015, The Guardian reported that a "significant number" of the complaints had been sent as part of a campaign orchestrated by the far-right group Britain First, in which supporters were asked to sign a templated email. Most of the complaints were allegations of electoral bias which Channel 4 deny. Critical reception of the mockumentary was negative, with reviewers finding the plot unrealistic.

== Production ==
The programme was made by Raw TV, who the previous year had made another documentary-type drama called Blackout about an imagined sabotage of Britain's electricity. It was written and directed by Chris Atkins, whose previous credits included Starsuckers. The programme was broadcast by Channel 4 in the 9pm slot, and was sponsored by Japanese motor company Lexus.

== Plot ==
Deepa Kaur is a British Sikh who has been elected for Romford as a UKIP MP, and her party win a slight majority to govern the country. Leader Nigel Farage becomes Prime Minister and makes Neil Hamilton his deputy, and the party makes changes in the country, such as bringing back smoking in pubs and using ex-soldiers to find illegal immigrants.

Kaur's brother loses his job at a factory when Britain leaves the European Union. Unrest begins on the street between those opposing and supporting the new government, to which UKIP responds by bringing in a new bank holiday to celebrate Britain and a new Festival of Britain. Kaur makes an abrupt decision against the government, after witnessing a raid searching for illegal immigrants which results in false charges being brought against an Asian teenager. Her change of heart ruins her chances of being promoted, but her brother praises her morality.

== Reception ==
=== Critical reception ===
Reviews for the mockumentary were mostly negative, with a few reviews praising Burford's performance, but otherwise criticising the plot, writing and political tone.

In a review in The Guardian, Julia Raeside praised Burford's acting, but called the programme as a whole "unconvincing" and "not exactly House of Cards or The Thick of It", concluding that

What could have been a nuanced look at a British political phenomenon, ends up not just pat, but feeling like a giant pat on the head. It won't aid Ukip's cause in the run up to the election, but it probably won't make much of a dent in it either.

Also in The Guardian, Zoe Williams wrote that the story about Kaur seemed unrealistic:

One is turfed off this rollercoaster with the take-home that she's a nice person who compromised to get to the top, whereas in fact she opened with a neo-fascist position – immigrants are the source of our malcontent, kick them out – and to redeem her from there without addressing, not her quest for power, but her support for Ukip in the first place, feels sloppy.

Ben Lawrence of The Daily Telegraph gave the programme two stars out of five. He noted a "metropolitan snideness" in its premise which marred the show, and wrote that

it made one fatal error. The white working class, the disenfranchised section of society that Farage has courted, were reduced to an unruly, stereotyped mob, an army of bald-headed, beer-swilling thugs. A braver, more thoughtful piece would have put a "white van man" type at the heart of the drama: challenged his prejudices, certainly, but also given him a voice.

Alex Hardy writing in The Times also awarded the mockumentary two stars out of five. He commended the point the drama was trying to make: "that Farage and co are hoisting themselves by their own petard" and praised some of the effects splicing real life footage with fictional scenes, but concluded that "ultimately everything was laid on so thick that it felt not only over-manipulative but also incredibly mawkish, especially in the closing twists."

In The Spectator, Sebastian Payne praised Burford's acting as Kaur, but found the plot unrealistic: "The main action sequences — riots and protests, backed by Unite and the Socialist Worker — jarred with the idea that Ukip had just been elected in a landslide. Why would swathes of the nation take to the streets after putting the people's army in No.10?". He also criticised the use of the flag of Israel in stock footage portraying a far-right group.

=== Complaints ===
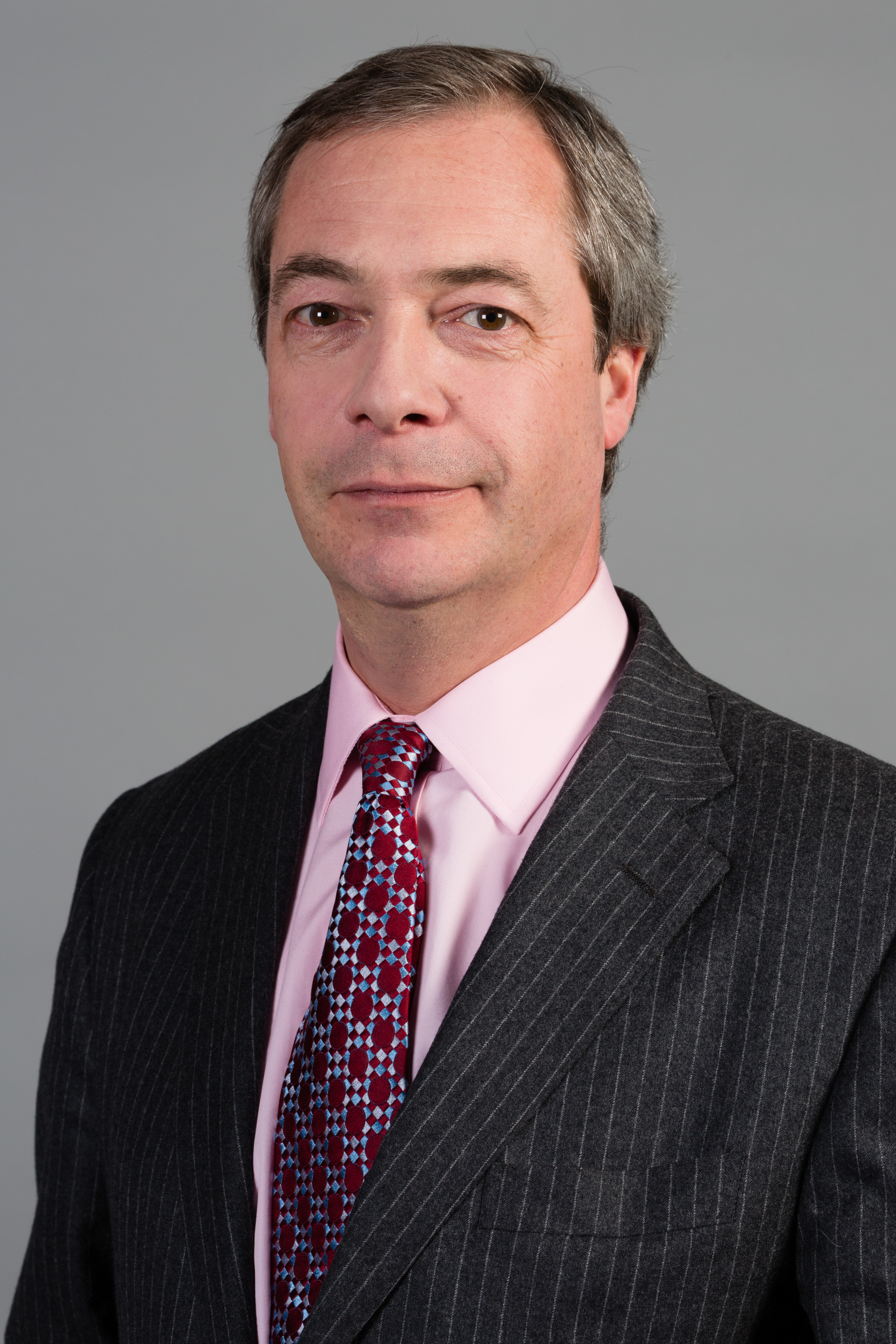
Former UKIP leader Nigel Farage claimed that the programme was biased against his party, which Channel 4 denied

Channel 4 aired the mockudrama on 16 February 2015. Before airing, it had already received "nearly 20" complaints to Ofcom. By the following day it had collectively attracted more than 1,000 complaints to Ofcom and Channel 4. UKIP candidate Gerald Batten called on Ofcom to investigate, saying "They can just spout their views and don’t actually have to go out and defend them in elections, which we do." and MEP Roger Helmer called it a "hatchet job". Farage was among those who criticised it, writing "Looks like 100 Days of UKIP may well have backfired on Channel 4. A biased, partisan depiction of the only party that Believes in Britain". Channel 4 responded by saying that they had invited him to watch it before its broadcast, an offer which was declined. Most of the complaints were allegations of unfair treatment of UKIP during an election period, to which Channel 4 defended themselves by saying that such a period as defined by Ofcom had not started. They said that before the election they would broadcast a "broad range of programming" to "encourage debate and engage viewers in political issues".

Within a week, the number of complaints to Ofcom had reached 5,262, with a further 1,300 complaints to Channel 4, prompting an investigation by the Ofcom. It generated more complaints than the most-complained-about programme in the whole of 2014, Celebrity Big Brother, which had 3,784 complaints. Ofcom stated that it was investigating UKIP: The First 100 Days because of the possibility it breach the regulator's rules on "offensive material, misleadingness and due impartiality." However, after a thorough investigation Ofcom ruled that there was no breach of the broadcasting code.

== See also ==
- Meet the Ukippers, BBC Two documentary which aired six days later
- Ballot Monkeys, Channel 4 2015 general election comedy
- Coalition, Channel 4 television film broadcast as part of the same season
