= Neil Kinrade =

Manx police officer

Neil Kinrade is the former Deputy Chief Constable of the Isle of Man Constabulary. He is well known for his part in unveiling the "Manx Bugging Scandal" of the late 1990s and 2000s, his subsequent suspension from duty and his clearing of his name, after taking a High Court Petition of Doleance action against the Chief Constable and the Minister of Home Affairs. He is a former Gambling Supervision Commissioner.

== Early career ==
The Manx-born Kinrade joined the constabulary and rose quickly through the ranks to chief inspector. In 1999, Mike Culverhouse was appointed Chief Constable following the retirement of Robin Oake QPM. Shortly afterwards at the end of January 2001, Neil Kinrade was appointed DCC.

Less than a month into his appointment it was revealed that Kinrade was under investigation by an off-island force after an incident in February 2000. However after a 2½ year investigation Kinrade was completely cleared of these charges.

== The Manx Bugging Scandal ==
On 23 October 2003, Minister of Home Affairs Minister Phil Braidwood announced in the House of Keys that a probe had been launched after claims a bug was used to monitor conversations between lawyers and clients at police headquarters for more than 10 years. Mike Culverhouse confirmed that the listening device’s use was common until Spring 1999 and the allegations could lead to a decade of convictions being re-examined. A lawyer claimed that this scandal had the potential to cost the taxpayer £500 million.

=== Suspension ===
In October 2003, Kinrade was suspended from duty in connection with an “ongoing enquiry”. Member of Tynwald, John Houghton MHK, a critic of the police force, said the “whole force is up in arms”. Kinrade was revered by the "rank and file" of the Isle of Man Constabulary.

Cheshire Constabulary were brought in to investigate the allegations of illegal bugging, Mr Kinrade made a statement categorically denying any “inappropriate or unlawful conduct” and stated that he had lodged a formal complaint against Mike Culverhouse.

=== High Court action ===
Kinrade lodged a Petition of Doleance with the Isle of Man High Court. The petition demanded judicial review of his suspension and its handling by Mike Culverhouse and the Department of Home Affairs.

During the next year, the court action was repeatedly delayed. Further suspensions of other officers were also made. In August 2004 the Isle of Man High Court action was halted. The terms of the settlement remained confidential but Neil Kinrade retired, "in line with his original intentions", and dropped his legal case and all disciplinary charges against him were dropped. It is rumoured the Department of Home Affairs paid around £1 million for Kinrade to drop his legal action.

On 24 January 2005, Kinrade's replacement was announced as former Chief Superintendent Mike Langdon from the Merseyside force.
