= Murder of Stephen Oake =

2003 murder of a UK police officer

Stephen Oake QGM
- Born: Stephen Robin Oake; 1962/63; Poynton, Cheshire, England
- Died: 14 January 2003 (aged 40); Crumpsall, Manchester, England
- Other name: Steve
- Spouse: Lesley
- Father: Robin Oake
- Police career
- Department: Greater Manchester Police
- Service years: 1982–2003
- Rank: Detective Constable
- Awards: Queen's Gallantry Medal

DC Stephen Robin Oake was a police officer serving as an anti-terrorism detective with Greater Manchester Police in the United Kingdom who was murdered while attempting to arrest a suspected terrorist in Manchester on 14 January 2003.

He was posthumously awarded the Queen's Gallantry Medal.

== Background ==
Oake was born in Poynton, Cheshire; his father Robin Oake is a former chief constable of the Isle of Man Constabulary and a recipient of the Queen's Police Medal. Stephen Oake served with Greater Manchester Police for almost 20 years until his death and as an anti-terrorism detective in the special branch since 1999. In 2002 he was commended for his professional skills and expertise.

== Murder ==
On 14 January 2003, Oake and colleagues went to Flat 4, 4 Crumpsall Lane, in the Crumpsall area of north Manchester, as part of an immigration operation. The resident was not expected to be there, but the police found three men, including Algerian illegal immigrant Kamel Bourgass, who had arrived in England in the back of a lorry three years before. Bourgass, who had attended Al-Muhajiroun meetings in the months leading up to the attack, was not immediately recognised despite being wanted in London in connection with what became known as the Wood Green ricin plot, a bioterrorism plot to attack the London Underground. He was not perceived to pose a threat and thus was not handcuffed by the officers.

However, believing that the officers had identified him in connection with the ricin plot, Bourgass made an attempt to escape and, in the process of doing so, punched one officer and picked up a kitchen knife. Oake, who was unarmed and not wearing protective clothing, went to restrain the suspect but was stabbed eight times in the chest and upper body, including one blow which penetrated his heart. Despite his extensive injuries, Oake continued trying to help his colleagues bring Bourgass under control. Three other officers suffered stab wounds before the suspect was eventually detained. Oake later died of his injuries.

== Aftermath ==
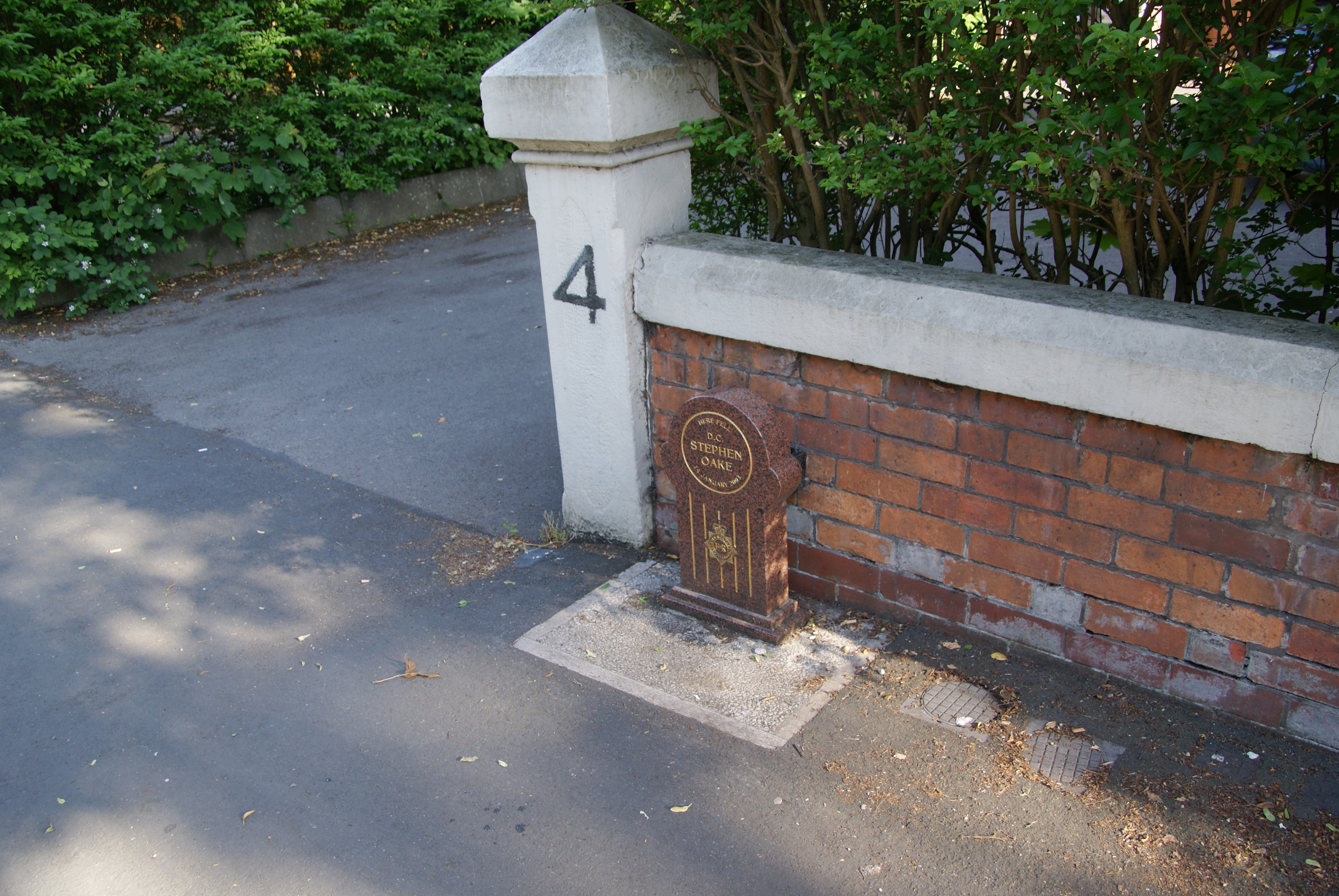
The memorial for DC Stephen Oake in Crumpsall, Manchester

The circumstances of Oake's murder led to debate over whether police in England and Wales should be free to handcuff any suspects, regardless of whether they pose an immediate or obvious threat of violence or escape. An inquiry into the incident criticised Oake's colleagues who led the raid for failing adequately to plan the operation.

External image
- Images of Oake's funeral in Manchester on 25 January 2003 (BBC News)

Oake's funeral at Manchester Cathedral was widely publicised and attended by over 1,000 people including prime minister Tony Blair. The cortege was escorted through Manchester city centre by mounted police wearing full ceremonial dress, and Oake's coffin was carried by six former colleagues through a guard of honour into the cathedral. Proceedings inside were relayed to a crowd of hundreds outside by loudspeaker.

In 2005 the Criminal Injuries Compensation Authority paid £13,000 to Oake's widow and to each of his three children, amounts which the Greater Manchester Police Federation said failed to match the sacrifice the detective had made.

A street in Manchester (53.500419°N 2.246306°W) was renamed Stephen Oake Close in his honour. In 2006, the Police Memorial Trust unveiled a granite stone memorial to Oake in Crumpsall Lane, near the location of his murder (53.5182853°N 2.2478478°W). About 150 people attended the unveiling ceremony, including his widow who had since remarried. The memorial was destroyed by vandals in March 2007 but replaced six months later. No-one was prosecuted for the memorial damage despite a £15,000 reward offered by the Manchester Evening News, Greater Manchester Police Authority, and the Police Memorial Trust.

In the years following his murder, there was debate over whether Oake should be formally recognised for his bravery in Bourgass' arrest, including a call from his chief constable for him to receive the highest civil decoration in the United Kingdom – the George Cross (GC). A civil service committee decided in 2006 that Oake's actions had not met the "extremely high" standards of bravery beyond the call of duty for the GC. He was, however, posthumously awarded the Queen's Gallantry Medal – the third-level civil decoration after the GC and George Medal – in 2009, only the ninth such posthumous award for a police officer since the creation of the medal in 1974. One of his colleagues, an unnamed Detective Sergeant, who was stabbed twice in the incident but survived, received a Queen's Commendation for Bravery. The awards were cited in The London Gazette of 6 January 2009.

Oake's father Robin is a strong evangelical Christian, as Stephen Oake was. Robin publicly forgave his son's murderer.

=== Bourgass's conviction and imprisonment ===
Kamel Bourgass was convicted at the Old Bailey on 29 June 2004 of the murder of Oake, of the attempted murder of two other officers and of the wounding of another. He had claimed he killed Oake out of fear, but was sentenced to life imprisonment with a minimum term of 22 years plus an additional 15 years for the attempted murder charges. Bourgass appealed against the conviction, which was upheld in July 2005.

A second trial in connection with the bioterrorism plot concluded on 8 April 2005. Bourgass was convicted of conspiracy to commit a public nuisance by using poisons or explosives and sentenced to an additional 17 years. A charge of conspiracy to commit murder in relation to the plot was left on file after the jury failed to reach a verdict on that count. Four other men, Mouloud Sihali, David Khalef, Sidali Feddag and Mustapha Taleb, who all knew Bourgass, were tried and acquitted. A second trial for four others, Samir Asli, Khalid Alwerfeli, Mouloud Bouhrama and Kamel Merzoug was abandoned.

As of 2010 Bourgass was serving his sentence at Wakefield prison in West Yorkshire. He was originally incarcerated at Frankland prison near Durham; in July 2008 trouble broke out after inmates set his cell on fire. After his move to Wakefield, it was reported in 2009 that Bourgass was recruiting fellow extremist prisoners to communicate with undercover al-Qaeda operatives in London in relation to a new poison plot. In February 2011, a High Court judge rejected an appeal filed by Bourgass' lawyers that segregation procedures taken by prison authorities breached his common law rights and human rights. The segregation followed allegations that Bourgass was trying to exert control over other prisoners, especially fellow Muslims whom he "pressurised" to attend prayers. He was also suspected of being involved in organising an assault on one prisoner who needed 50 stitches to his face.

Bourgass became eligible for parole in January 2026, but an application for his release was denied by the Parole Board on 2 February.

== See also ==
- Wood Green ricin plot
- List of terrorist incidents in Great Britain
- List of British police officers killed in the line of duty
