= John Houghton (Manx politician) =

Manx politician

Member of the House of Keys for Douglas North
- In office 2001 – September 22, 2016

Personal details
- Born: John Ramsey Houghton; 1958 or 1959 (age 66–67) Douglas, Isle of Man
- Party: Independent
- Children: 2

John Ramsey Houghton MHK (born 1958/1959 in Douglas, Isle of Man) is a former Isle of Man politician who served as Member of the House of Keys for Douglas North until losing his seat in the 2016 Manx General Election. He has two daughters.

== Political career ==
Houghton is an outspoken critic of the Isle of Man Constabulary and its former Chief Constable, Mike Culverhouse. During the 'Manx Bugging Scandal' in 2000, he publicly supported former Deputy Chief Constable Neil Kinrade. Houghton previously served as a Commandant of the Special Constabulary and Chairman of the Civil Service Commission.

In 2009, Houghton objected to the Gender Recognition Bill as he believed new laws to protect the rights of transsexuals living on the Isle of Man would "defy common decency".

It was announced on July 16, 2012, that he was to take over from Graham Creegen as Chairman of Isle of Man Water Auth.

Houghton lost his seat in the general election held on 22 September 2016.

=== Pension controversy ===
In December 2014, it was discovered that out of the 24 MHKs he was the only one not paying into the Tynwald Members Pension Scheme (despite an earlier statement to the contrary). Back in March 2012, he had described an enquiry sent to all members of the Manx parliament from Manx Radio as to whether they would contribute towards their taxpayer funded Tynwald pension message as "arrogant", asked if they had nothing better to do and followed that up with a personal attack on the station.

=== Accusations of poor behaviour ===
Houghton has been reprimanded or disciplined on a number of occasions by the President of Tynwald and the Speaker of the House of Keys for his unparliamentary language. In 2011, during a 3-day Tynwald session Houghton was accused a number of times of abusing his Tynwald privileges and for making verbal attacks on civil service officers. In May 2016, Houghton was the subject of a parliamentary committee report brought before Tynwald due to accusations of "lying, bullying and interfering in a staff dispute". His behaviour was also described as ‘unrelenting, aggressive and unprecedented’ and led to a member of staff in the Clerk of Tynwald's office resigning.

== Governmental positions ==
- Chairman of Isle of Man Water and Sewerage Authority, 2012–present
- Chairman of the Civil Service Commission, 2004–?
- Member of the Whitely Council, 2004–09
