= United Kingdom government formation =

United Kingdom government formation may refer to:

- 2010 United Kingdom government formation
- 2017 United Kingdom government formation
- 2022 United Kingdom government formation
