= Isle of Man Airport Police =

Isle of Man Airport Security, formerly known in the early nineties as Airport Police, was a small security force responsible for security at the Isle of Man Airport in Ronaldsway, Isle of Man. In April 2019 it was announced that the role of the airport security was being placed under review and that subsequently the role of providing security at Ronaldsway Airport could be undertaken by a private contractor. Consequently the Isle of Man Airport Security were disbanded at the end of September 2019.

== Organisation ==
The Isle of Man Airport security was staffed by thirteen sworn and warranted constables, supervised by managers who were also warranted constables (see below). Having completed aviation security training they were sworn in by an Isle of Man Commissioner of Oaths as aviation security officers and received warrant cards as sworn constables, assuming the title of Aviation Security Officer.

They held the same authority and powers as a regular police officer whilst on (or near to) airport property. They were also authorised to act on behalf of the Coroner at the Airport when required.

Cover was provided 24 hours a day, 365 days a year, whether the airport was open or closed. Aviation Security Officers were fully integrated into the airport's staff structure, so that (unusually) the airport security had no management grades with sworn constables carrying out the duties of their office on the ground, but reporting to managers who shared their security powers. The managers of airport security officers were the Airport Duty Officers, and their supervisor was the Airport Director. Current Airport Director Ann Reynolds stated at the time of her appointment that the officers "provide first class security for this major point of entry to our Island".

== Headquarters ==
The Headquarters of the Isle of Man Airport Security was the Aviation Security Section Building on the Ronaldsway airport estate. From here officers would patrol the "airport estate and adjacent areas".

== Qualifications and duties ==
The stated qualifications required of an officer were:

- possession of a warrant as a Constable
- physical fitness
- literacy and numeracy
- possession of a category B driving licence
- good interpersonal skills

Duties were categorised in five groups:

- control and guard duties (controlling access, crowds, and vehicles)
- patrol duties by foot or vehicle (patrolling terminals, operational buildings, car parks, airfield, and boundaries)
- custodian duties (issuing of keys and identity cards, and management of lost property)
- escort and protection duties (in respect of VIP passengers, high-value cargoes, and government vehicles)
- general duties (including emergency incident procedures, radio operation, crime prevention & detection, exercising powers of arrest, liaising with other emergency services)

== Unfair dismissal and bullying ==
In 2009, an aviation security officer who had been a sworn constable for 17 years in the Isle of Man Airport Security, formerly known as the Isle of Man Airport Police, was unfairly dismissed. His appeal to a tribunal for unfair dismissal was subsequently unanimously upheld, on the basis that the investigation was found to be "incomplete" and "unbalanced". An order to reinstate or compensate was ruled. The tribunal also highlighted long-standing unrepaired door defects affecting security at the airport.

Evidence from several aviation security officers, supported by a "collective grievance" letter from six staff members, alleged a pattern of disruptive and bullying behaviour on the part of a named Airport Duty Officer, Paul Smith (ADO). A constable gave evidence that in his opinion officers were being deliberately victimised and targeted because they had stood up to bullying by the named ADO.

== See also ==
- Isle of Man Constabulary
