= Chris Atkins (filmmaker) =

British filmmaker

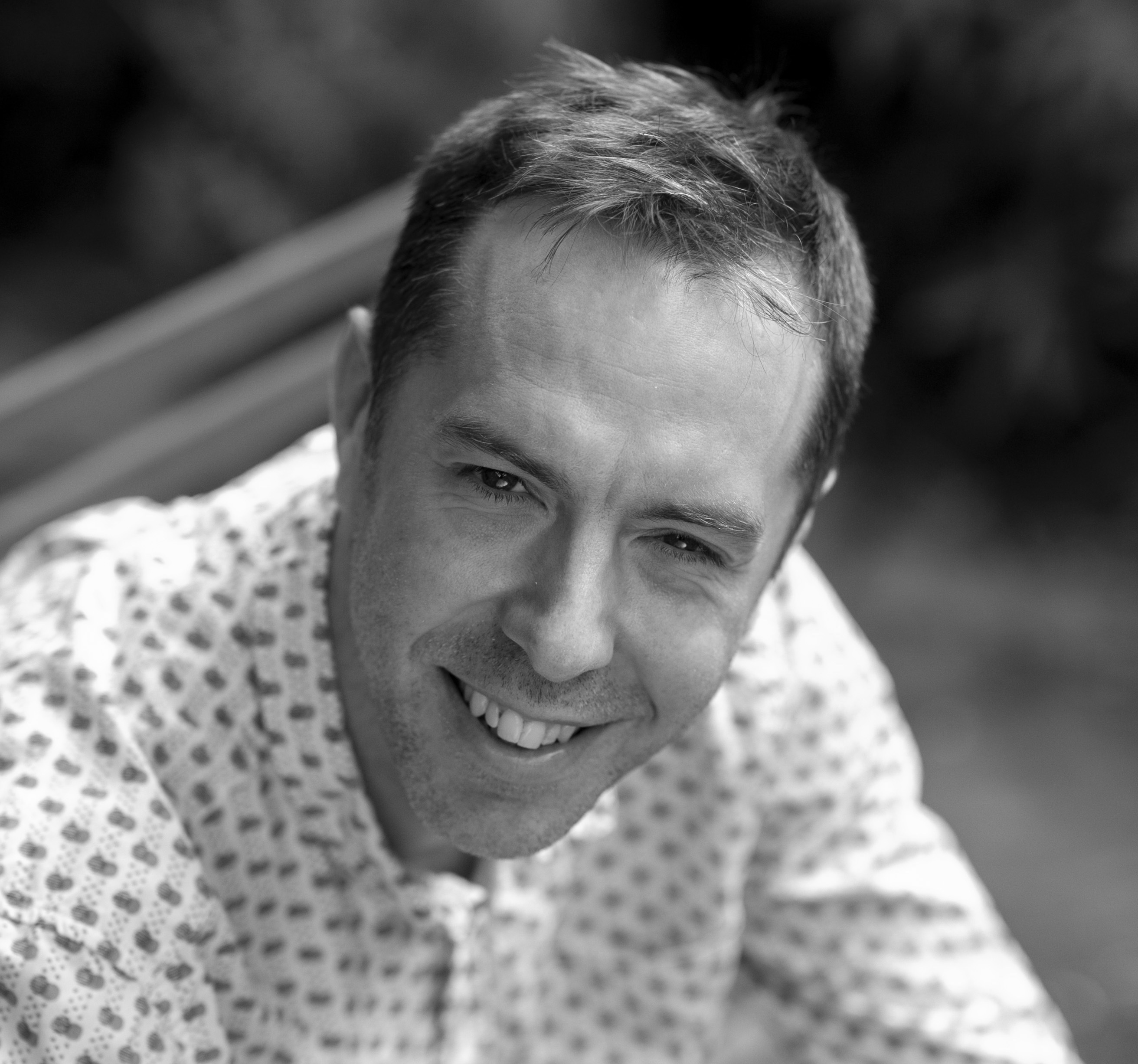
- Chris Atkins
- Born: Christopher Walsh Atkins
- Education: Bromsgrove School
- Occupations: Documentary film maker & author
- Notable work: Taking Liberties; Starsuckers
- Criminal charges: "Conspiracy to cheat the public revenue"
- Criminal penalty: 5-year prison sentence, disqualified from being a company official for 12 years

Christopher Walsh Atkins is a British journalist, documentary film maker and best-selling author. He has made several fiction feature films, feature-length documentaries and television documentaries, which have received three BAFTA nominations.

His work is noted for causing controversy and has faced legal action as a result of his films. He gave evidence to the Leveson Inquiry into the ethics of the British press. In 2016 he was sentenced to five years in prison for tax fraud. He published a book about his time in jail entitled A Bit of a Stretch which became a bestseller in the UK.

== Early life and career ==
Atkins was educated at Bromsgrove School from 1989 to 1994. His early career involved making low-budget dramas with director Richard Jobson, including Jobson's debut feature film, 16 Years of Alcohol, which was nominated for five British Independent Film Awards in 2003, winning two. He also produced The Purifiers with Jobson in 2004, a martial arts film set in the future, which was acquired by Working Title and released in the US by New Line Cinema. In 2005, he produced Jobson's A Woman in Winter, starring Jamie Sivves, Julie Gayet and Brian Cox. It was nominated for two Scottish BAFTAs, including best film.

== Documentaries ==
=== Taking Liberties ===
In 2007, Atkins directed his first feature documentary Taking Liberties, which criticised the Blair government for undermining civil liberties since the war on terror. While making Taking Liberties, Atkins was held under anti-terror laws when he tried to speak with the Home Secretary John Reid at the 2006 Labour Party conference. The film was released in over 50 British cinemas shortly before Blair stepped down in 2007. The Guardian's Peter Bradshaw gave the film 4 stars, saying "there's something exhilarating about this thoroughly enjoyable and worthwhile docu-blast against Tony Blair's insidious diminution of native British liberties." The film was BAFTA nominated for the "Carl Foreman award for special achievement by a British director, writer or producer in their first feature film" in the 2008 British Academy Film Awards.

=== Starsuckers ===
In 2009, Atkins directed his second feature documentary, Starsuckers, which heavily criticised the media for the negative effects of celebrity culture. The film gained wide notoriety for selling fake celebrity stories to several British tabloid newspapers, and for secretly filming journalists from Sunday tabloids, who were attempting to buy celebrity medical records. The Guardian newspaper published two front-page stories about Starsuckers in October 2009, and the News of the World quickly contacted the filmmakers to threaten legal action for secretly filming their journalist but this was not pursued.

Atkins also secretly filmed the celebrity publicist Max Clifford boasting about how he kept embarrassing stories about his clients out of the media. Clifford also tried to legally block the film's release. (Coincidentally, both men would later be imprisoned at HM Prison Wandsworth.)

The film criticised Bob Geldof, alleging negative consequences of both Live Aid and Live 8 charity concerts, leading Geldof to write Atkins a 6,000-word letter, attacking the film days before it was screened on Channel 4 in 2010. Thirty minutes of footage from Starsuckers were shown as part of Atkins' evidence to the Leveson Inquiry. His evidence was quoted extensively in Leveson's final report.

=== UKIP: The First 100 Days ===
In 2015, Atkins wrote and directed UKIP: The First 100 Days, a mockumentary drama for Channel 4. The film was set in an imagined future where UKIP won the 2015 general election, and mixed real news reports with fly on the wall style footage of a fictional MP, Deepa Kaur. The film was broadcast on 16 February 2015 and caused considerable controversy, leading to over 6000 complaints to the broadcasting regulator Ofcom. UKIP supporters were upset that the film portrayed the party's policies in a negative light so close to the general election. Ofcom rejected all of the complaints and ruled that the film had not breached the regulations.

=== Work for Channel 4 and BBC ===
Atkins went on to make TV documentaries for the Channel 4 television series Dispatches. In 2012 he spent a year undercover investigating the illegal trade in confidential data, in which Atkins bought private information on volunteers from unwitting private detectives to illustrate the ease with which data is bought and sold on the black market. The film culminated in Atkins being unmasked by two private detectives who chased him down a street.

He also produced and directed the Dispatches special "Celebs, Brands and Fake Fans", which attempted to show how social media popularity can be bought and sold. The film generated considerable controversy when it was revealed that Atkins had secretly filmed several members of the ITV soap Coronation Street at a gifting suite, where he handed out fake products in return for glowing endorsement tweets. The investigation was run on the front of The Sun and The Mirror newspapers, and ITV threatened to sue Channel 4 if the film was broadcast. It was screened in August 2013 without any subsequent legal action.

In 2013, he produced and directed the Panorama episode "All in a Good Cause", which looked into unethical investments made by charities such as Comic Relief, the aftermath of which resulted in Atkins claiming he had, "turned into the comedy establishment's most hated man". The investigation into Comic Relief's investments, and the resulting public outcry, led to the charity selling off millions of pounds of shares in arms companies, alcohol firms and tobacco manufacturers and changing its investment policy. Atkins' Panorama was nominated for a Scottish BAFTA in 2014.

Atkins wrote a courtroom drama Vardy v Rooney: A Courtroom Drama for Channel 4, a 2-part miniseries based on the events of the high-profile Wagatha Christie trial which recreated scenes using verbatim court transcripts against analysis from the media. It was broadcast in December 2022 and starred Michael Sheen.

=== Who Killed the KLF? ===
Atkins directed the 2021 feature documentary Who Killed the KLF?, about the KLF. He began making it in 2009. KLF members Jimmy Cauty and Bill Drummond refused to appear in the film and at one point filed a copyright claim against Atkins to prevent usage of the band's music. The film was released in cinemas in 2022 and then broadcast on Sky TV in the UK and was not subject to any legal action. Atkins has written that the band have since given the film their approval. The film was well received by critics and has a 100% rating on Rotten Tomatoes.

== Writing ==
Atkins occasionally writes for The Guardian The Times and The Daily Mail. Atkins was also a credited writer on the BBC3 show The Revolution Will Be Televised, which featured political stunts by Heydon Prowse and Joylon Rubenstein. The first series won a Television BAFTA in 2012, and was nominated again in 2013.

== Personal life ==
Atkins was in a relationship with Lottie Moggach. The pair remain close and have one son.

== Criminal conviction ==
In 2016, Atkins went on trial at Southwark Crown Court for tax fraud. He had been arrested in 2012 by HMRC's Fraud Investigation Service as part of an enquiry into tax evasion schemes within the British film industry. The court heard how Atkins and others had falsified invoices for a partnership of bankers, in return for their funding his film Starsuckers. He was found guilty on two counts of "conspiracy to cheat the public revenue, theft and fraud", sentenced to five years in jail and disqualified from acting as a company official for 12 years. A later investigation by the i newspaper established that Atkins did not financially gain and all of the money from the scheme – £85,000 – was spent on funding the film.

=== A Bit of a Stretch ===
Atkins kept a diary recording his experiences in HM Prison Wandsworth, between July 2016, when he was sentenced, and March 2017, when he was transferred to an open prison. It was published in February 2020 as A Bit of a Stretch, and received highly positive reviews in several newspapers. Atkins is developing the book into a TV show after the screen rights were bought by Sony-backed 11th Hour Films.

He released a podcast series on prison life, also called A Bit of a Stretch, in October 2020. It was based on over twenty interviews Atkins conducted with former prisoners about their time behind bars. The podcast was given 4 stars by The Times and achieved over 200,000 downloads. He started a prison literacy campaign the same year, convincing publishers to donate thousands of new books to prison libraries during the pandemic.

== Filmography ==
Year	Film	Type	Role
2007	Taking Liberties	Documentary feature	Director
2009	Starsuckers	Documentary feature	Director
2012	Dispatches: "Watching The Detectives"	TV investigation	Presenter/Director/Producer
2013	Dispatches: "Celebs, Brands and Fake Fans"	TV investigation	Presenter/Director/Producer
2013	Panorama: "All In A Good Cause?"	TV investigation	Director/Producer
2015	UKIP: The First 100 Days	Mockumentary feature	Writer / director
2021	Who Killed the KLF?	Documentary Feature	Director

== Bibliography ==
- Atkins, Chris; Bee, Sarah; Button, Fiona (2007). Taking Liberties. Revolver Books. ISBN 978-1905978038.
- Atkins, Chris (2020). A Bit of a Stretch: The Diary of a Prisoner. Atlantic Books. ISBN 9781838950156.
- Atkins, Chris (2023). Time After Time: Repeat Offenders – The Inside Stories. Atlantic Books. ISBN 9781838954666.
