= Time Teens =

Time Teens: The Beginning
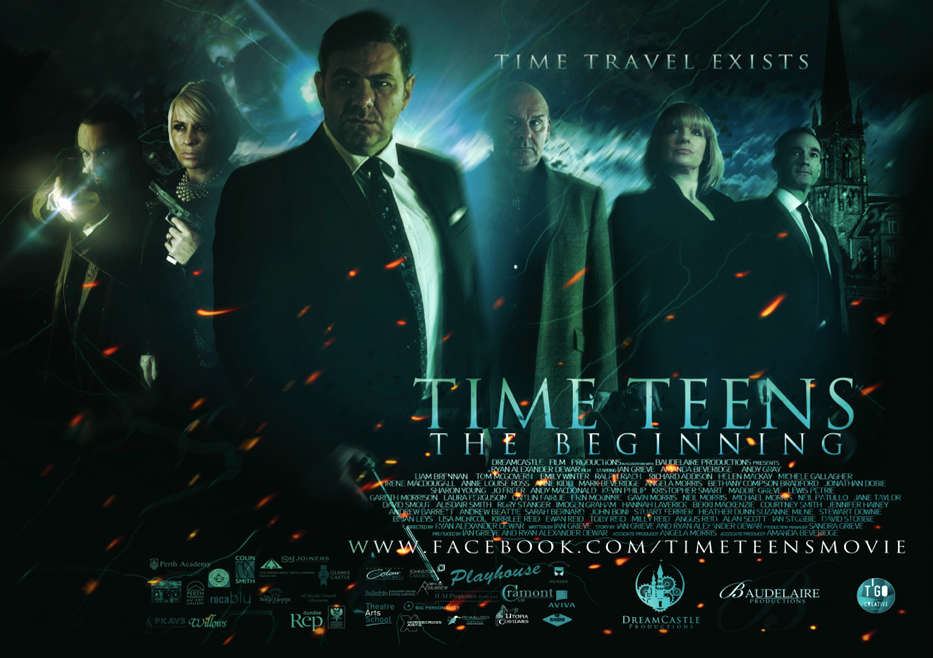
- Theatrical release poster
- Directed by: Ryan Alexander Dewar
- Written by: Ian Grieve
- Starring: Andy Gray; Ian Grieve; Emily Winter; Ralph Riach
- Release date: 25 February 2015 (Scotland)
- Running time: 114 minutes
- Country: Scotland (UK)
- Language: English

Time Teens: The Beginning is a 2015 Scottish feature film directed by Ryan Alexander Dewar. It was originally written as a TV Series by writer/actor Ian Grieve around ten years earlier. Grieve was resident director in Perth Theatre where he met Dewar and they pursued Grieve's TV scripts as a short film.

== Plot ==
Time travel exists. William is a Tourasaiche, Pilgrim Time traveller, policing time crime. When he receives a letter from the future, he has to decide if his future will happen how it is written, or if things can be changed.

== Cast ==
Appearing in the film are:

- Andy Gray as Black Ruthven
- Ralph Riach as The Meridian
- Ian Grieve
- Annie Louise Ross as The Victorian Woman
- Anne Kidd as Ghost Madelaine Lockhart
- Liam Brennan as Edwin
- Tom McGovern as The harlequin
- Helen Mackay
- Irene MacDougall as Andrea Novotny
- Gareth Morrison
- Amanda Beveridge as Miranda
- Emily Winter as Emma
- Richard Addison as Lawrence Toureq
- Michele Gallagher as Jenny Buchan
- Sharon Young as Buccaneer
- Jo Freer as Buccaneer
- Lewis Winter Petrie as Ricky

== Production ==
After filming for four days in 2013, the films duration was too long to be a short film but too short to be a full feature. The short film soon turned into a feature film with a plethora of Scottish cast coming on board the production. The filming occurred within 2 weeks over a one-year period. Production took place in under three weeks over 2013 and 2014. Sponsor contributions made up £5,000 production budget. The release date was put back as Dewar and Grieve appealed for assistance to get the project finished.

== Release ==
The film premiered in February 2015 at the Perth Playhouse Cinema on an IMAX screen and was then shown there for the following 3 weeks.

It had screenings at:

- North By Midwest Micro-budget film festival in Michigan In May 2015
- the Fife Film Expo in Scotland in May 2015
- Aberdeen International Film Festival in Scotland in October 2015

== Reception ==
Some complained that the film did not include enough teenagers and was perhaps difficult in its concepts for younger audiences. Suggesting that the name could have been changed, though understood it was a pilot for a longer series.

=== Awards and nominations ===
Time Teens picked up an award at the monthly San Francisco Film awards and an award from the Accolade Film Award Competition. In Spring, the film picked up Best Narrative Feature in the Alaska International Film Festival, Nominated for Best Director in International Euro Film Festival and Ryan won Best Director and Ian, Best Actor in a leading Role at the International Independent Film Awards 2015. At the North by Midwest micro budget film festival, the film also picked up 2nd place for Long feature.

Nomination have extended to the Deep Fried Film Festival for best Science Fiction and nomination for Best Cinematography in Fife Film Expo.

The film opened with generally positive reviews with average weighted ratings between 7 and 8 out of 10.

== TV script ==
Alongside the film, a TV script was also written. The end of the film is 'The Beginning' of the series.
