= Mouloud Sihali =

Suspected Algerian terrorist (born 1976)

Mouloud Sihali (born March 1976 in Algeria) was a suspect in the Wood Green ricin plot. He arrived as an illegal immigrant in the UK in 1997, having left Algeria to avoid national service. He was arrested on 19 Sep 2002 on suspicion of having the intent to poison as part of a terror attack in the UK, and was charged on 22 January 2003. No evidence of production of the poison ricin was presented at the trial, which opened in September 2004 at the Old Bailey. Sihali was acquitted of the charges in April 2005, but was re-arrested on 15 September 2005, and held as a terrorist suspect. He is acquitted and does not face deportation. This is the case of 'wrong place at the wrong time' situation or a case of looking for 'scapegoats'.
