= Starsuckers (2009 film) =

- Directed by: Chris Atkins
- Produced by: Felicity Leabeater, Christina Slater
- Release date: 28 October 2009
- Country: United Kingdom
- Language: English

Starsuckers is a 2009 British documentary film aiming to expose the "shams and deceit involved in creating a pernicious celebrity culture".

Directed by Chris Atkins, director of the 2007 documentary Taking Liberties, it shows the production team planting a variety of celebrity-related stories in the UK media, such as a claim that the singer Avril Lavigne had been seen asleep in a nightclub. A variety of tabloid newspapers accepted the stories without corroboration or evidence.

The film launched as part of the British Film Institute's 53rd Film Festival. Thirty minutes of footage from the film were shown to the Leveson Inquiry as part of the evidence presented by the film's director, Chris Atkins.

== Legal threats from Max Clifford ==
On 23 October 2009, six days before the Starsuckers premiere, the makers reported that they had received an e-mail from the law firm Carter-Ruck, acting on behalf of controversial publicist Max Clifford and threatening them with an injunction.

== Criminal convictions ==
In December 2015, three City traders, James Hyde, Hamish Maclellan, and Phillip Jenkins, along with their accountant Terence Potter, were convicted of conspiring to cheat HM Revenue & Customs by falsifying documents to show that they had each actively worked 10 or more hours a week on the production of Starsuckers and were eligible for tax rebates. Three other defendants were acquitted at the same trial.

In June 2016, two further producers of Starsuckers, Christopher Walsh Atkins and Christina Slater, were convicted of the same charge of conspiring to cheat HM Revenue & Customs, and were jailed for 5 and 4 years respectively. Terence Potter was again convicted.

== See also ==
- Narcissism
