= Forest Gate raid =

2009 police anti-terrorism operation in London

Coordinates: 51.5411°N 0.0360°E

Photo taken on the day after the Forest Gate raid, at the end of Lansdown Road, showing police officers maintaining the blocking of the road and in the distance, a forensic tent in front of the two properties raised

The Forest Gate raid was a Metropolitan Police operation on 2 June 2006. It resulted in the arrest of two men at their east London homes in Forest Gate by police acting on what they described as "specific intelligence" that they might be terrorists in possession of a chemical bomb. One of the men was shot during the raid. No explosive devices were found during the raid, nor was there any evidence of terrorist activity. The men were released without charge. Mohammed Abdul Kahar was again cleared, after 44 indecent images of children had been found on a computer's hard drive, an external hard drive, and a mobile phone recovered during the raid. No charges were filed, as: "The prosecution was not satisfied that Mr Kahar had the necessary computer expertise to enable him ... to transfer the images to the Nokia phone."

Subsequent inquiries cleared the officers involved of any "criminal or disciplinary offence". Metropolitan Police apologised for the raid. The apology was welcomed by the families affected, but they demanded the investigation of the steps the police took to assess the quality of the intelligence leading to the raids.

The cost of the operation exceeded £2 million.

== The raid ==
Early on Friday, 2 June 2006, police raided two houses on Lansdown Road, Forest Gate, London, acting on intelligence that there was a chemical weapon located at the premises. Under the authority of the Terrorism Act, they arrested brothers Mohammed Abdul Kahar, 23, and Abdul Koyair, 20. During the raid, Kahar was shot in the shoulder (some sources mention "chest" based on Kahar's comment of "There was blood coming down my chest.") by the police and was taken to the Royal London Hospital. Initial press rumours suggested that he had been shot by his brother, but the police later stated that the shot had been fired accidentally by the armed officer leading the operation. Two hundred and fifty police officers were involved in the raid.

In the same raid, an unnamed and unrelated family, renting a neighbouring terraced house from the father of the two arrested men, was also raided in conditions that have been described by their lawyer as "as lawless as the wild west."

Nearby roads were closed to the public for several days whilst investigations were carried out, and a prohibition on aircraft flying below 2,500 ft was imposed on the area. However, no chemical materials were found and the two brothers were released without charge on the evening of 9 June. After the two men gave a press conference on 13 June, the Metropolitan Police apologised for the "hurt" caused.

The Metropolitan Police revealed under freedom of information legislation that what was known as Operation Volga had cost £2,211,600, including £864,300 on overtime payments for the dozens of police officers involved, £90,000 on hotel bills, and £120,000 for repairs to the damage caused to the houses by the police.

It has been alleged that a British Muslim, Abu Bakr Mansha, who was jailed in January 2006 on terrorism charges and who grew up in the neighbourhood, had provided the intelligence "trigger" for the raid, although this has been denied by his lawyer.

== Protests ==
Protests by Muslim groups were held outside Scotland Yard on Friday 9 June and on Sunday 11 June, where a sister of those arrested said that she hoped that the protests would "highlight the fact no other innocent family should be forced to go through the same nightmare."

On 18 June 2006, approximately 5,000 people from a broad cross-section of local communities marched throughout Newham to Forest Gate Police Station in a protest against the violent nature in which the raids had taken place. The march was organised by a coalition of local groups, including the main support group to the families Newham Monitoring Project.

== Reactions ==
Reactions to the raid were mixed. Scotland Yard's Assistant Commissioner Andy Hayman said that they had "no choice but to act" but also apologised for the "disruption and inconvenience" the raid caused. The Muslim Council of Britain welcomed the releases, but hoped "lessons would be learned".

The then Prime Minister, Tony Blair, said that he supported the police "101%", adding that "You can only imagine if they fail to take action and something terrible happened what outcry would be then, so they are in an impossible situation." The prime minister also defended police chief Ian Blair, when several papers called on him to resign over the raid. A solicitor for the two men said that they planned to sue the Metropolitan Police, for a figure which lawyers estimated could be as high as £500,000, but at a press conference on 13 June 2006 Abdul Kahar said that suing the police was "not even in our heads", and they were more interested in an apology. As of 21 July 2006, he had not returned to the house.

== Inquiries ==
The shooting was referred to Independent Police Complaints Commission, who prepared a leaflet about its enquiry for distribution to homes and other locations in the area. On 10 July 2006, the IPCC confirmed that there would be a second inquiry regarding claims made by neighbours of the house raided.

On 3 August 2006, the Independent Police Complaints Commission concluded that the shooting was an "accident". They said that based on forensic evidence, "there is no evidence of intent or recklessness on the part of the firearms officer and that no offence was committed in the firing of the weapon." Scotland Yard released a statement saying it regretted that an accidental discharge had caused injury.

It also emerged on 3 August that Mohammed Abdul Kahar had been investigated by police on suspicion of knowingly possessing pornographic pictures of children, and was in custody at a London police station. He strenuously denied the allegations. On the advice of the Crown Prosecution Service, no charges were brought against him.

On 13 February 2007, the IPCC released its second inquiry. The IPCC concluded that the police had not used excessive force given the intelligence they used, but that they should have changed their response once it became clear that the situation was under control and there was no imminent threat. The IPCC upheld complaints about the treatment of suspects in custody, particularly over the withholding of medication from Mr Abdulkahar. The IPCC also concluded that the high-profile nature of the raid merited a high-profile apology, and urged the Metropolitan Police to publicly apologise to the two families involved. Families involved in the raid criticised the IPCC for failing to investigate how the police had obtained and handled the erroneous intelligence that led to the raid.

== Media representation ==
- Taking Liberties – Documentary about the implications of anti terrorism legislation on civil rights in the UK.

== Cultural references ==
- In the Channel 4 film Britz, the Muslim British protagonist agrees to work for the MI5 and to carry out privacy-invading actions to collect evidence from suspected terrorists, but solely under the condition that the evidence supplied against them is adequate. He directly references the Forest Gate Incident as a case where it was not.
