= Meet the Ukippers =

- Genre: Documentary
- Directed by: Kevin Hull
- Country of origin: United Kingdom
- Original language: English
- No. of episodes: 1

Production
- Executive producer: Darren Kemp
- Producer: Kevin Hull
- Running time: 47:34

Original release
- Network: BBC Two
- Release: 22 February 2015

Meet the Ukippers is a British documentary that first aired on BBC Two on 22 February 2015. The film follows the activities of the UK Independence Party (UKIP) in South Thanet, a constituency in South East England which had selected party leader Nigel Farage to contest the 2015 general election. Tracking the party's fortunes over a period of six months, the programme focused primarily on the activists who hoped to get Farage elected as an MP. While some attempted to explain UKIP's message, others were seen to express controversial opinions about race and immigration. Prior to its broadcast, some of the film's content led to one UKIP councillor being expelled from the party after she referred to black people as "negros". The film received generally positive reviews, with favourable comparisons drawn with a docudrama aired the previous week that had offered a fictitious account of Britain's first UKIP government. Meet the Ukippers attracted an audience of 1.42 million, giving BBC Two their best ratings for a factual programme broadcast in the 10.00pm Sunday evening slot since 2012.

== Synopsis ==
The film follows the fortunes of Liz Langton, a hotel owner with a collection of porcelain clowns who was briefly UKIP's press officer in South Thanet, the constituency that selected Farage to fight the 2015 general election. It is 2014, and UKIP are enjoying a surge in popularity as Langton is seen attempting to deal with a series of public relations disasters that threaten to harm its public image. These include a remark made by MEP Janice Atkinson during a visit to the area when she described a Thai constituent as "a ting tong from somewhere", and revelations that Martyn Heale, the Chair of Thanet's branch of UKIP, had once belonged to the National Front. Langton brushes off both of these instances as minor follies, but is soon dealing with another PR catastrophe after a conversation with UKIP councillor Rozanne Duncan in which Duncan discusses her dislike of "Negros" and "people with Negroid features". She is advised to "tone it down a bit", but when details of her views are leaked to the media, Duncan is expelled from UKIP. Langton is seen to become increasingly disillusioned with the views of UKIP's members and eventually resigns from her post.

== Reception ==
The film received generally positive reviews, although several critics expressed their concern about the nature of its content. Describing the documentary as "riveting", Iona McLaren of The Daily Telegraph observed that it had "turned up such outrageous, absurd racism that it could well have been actors playing out a very heavy satire. She also compared it favourably to UKIP: The First 100 Days, a Channel 4 docudrama attempting to portray a fictional account of life under a UKIP government that had aired a few days previously. "You would be forgiven [if you] had confused it with the fictional docudrama that so angered Farage last week". Viv Groskop of The Guardian described it as "astonishing, terrifyingly watchable". The Daily Mirror's Ian Hyland compared it favourably to the Channel 4 documentary, suggesting it was a "lesson in TV making", while suggesting the footage gave the impression that the party was "a cross between The League of Gentlemen and Maggie the vomiting WI lady from Little Britain".

== Viewership ==
Meet the Ukippers aired in the 10.00pm time slot, with overnight viewing figures suggesting it to have been the most watched BBC Two factual programme shown at that time on a Sunday evening since Louis Theroux: Twilight of the Pornstars aired in June 2012. Meet the Ukippers attained an audience of 1.42 million (an 8.5% audience share) compared with Theroux's documentary, which had achieved a viewership of 1.8 million (9.4%).

== Controversy ==
Shortly before the documentary was aired, Rozanne Duncan said that she had no regrets about her comments, and attempted to defend them by claiming that her use of the word Negro was a descriptive term: "I still honestly believe that what I said was never at any time racist or derogatory," that she "used the word "Negroes" as you would do Asians, Chinese, Muslims, Jews. It's a description, it's not an insult - in the same way as you would say, 'What do you mean by Jewish? Well, they belong to a community, they have got a certain faith, they have usually got noses that have got a bit of a curve to them, married women - if they are orthodox Jews - wear wigs," and "there is absolutely no way I am a racist". Duncan further tried to deflect accusations of racism by saying that she felt "ok" when on a holiday in the Caribbean, where many African-Caribbean people live.

Addressing the issue on the 22 February edition of BBC Radio 4's Broadcasting House, Nigel Farage said that the party had been right to expel her: "Clearly she doesn't have any understanding of the deep offence she has caused by her comments, and we took the right decision."

Soul singer Beverley Knight was subjected to racial abuse by a user on social media site Twitter after she posted tweets expressing her disgust at the comments made by Duncan.
