= Ian Grieve =

Scottish actor

Ian Grieve is a Scottish actor. He is most famous for his playing the role of the Labour Prime Minister Gordon Brown. He played Brown in “The Confessions of Gordon Brown”, which was performed at the Edinburgh Fringe, at Trafalgar Studios in London, and at a Labour Party Conference, and in the drama Coalition.

Grieve wrote and starred in "Time Teens: The Beginning", Directed by Ryan Alexander Dewar. The film is based on a pilot television series written by Grieve.
