= Abu Bakr Mansha =

Man convicted of terrorism in the UK

- Born: 1983 or 1984 (age 40–41)
- Known for: convicted terrorist

Abu Bakr Mansha (born c. 1983/1984) is a person who was convicted under the Terrorism Act 2000 in the United Kingdom.

A police raid on his flat in Thamesmead found a blank-firing gun that someone was trying to convert to fire live rounds, as well as DVDs containing "virulent anti-Western propaganda" relating to Osama bin Laden and the allied attack on Dubai.

Also in his possession was a copy of a Sun newspaper article about Corporal Mark Byles, decorated British soldier, as well as a piece of paper with the soldier's former address; it was alleged that he had been planning to hunt down and kill Corporal Byles.

He was tried before a jury under the Terrorism Act 2000, on a charge of possessing information "likely to be useful to a person committing or preparing an act of terrorism". During his trial his defence barrister described him as an "utter incompetent"; he was later reported to have an IQ of 69. He was convicted on 22 December 2005, and sentenced to six years in jail on 26 January 2006 in Southwark crown court by Judge Nicholas Loraine-Smith.

In June 2006 there was a report alleging that he provided the tip-off from prison that triggered the 2 June 2006 Forest Gate raid. His lawyer, Sara O'Keefe, denied he was responsible, although she confirmed that police had visited her client in prison and that he knew the two brothers involved.
