= Who Killed the KLF? =

2021 British film

- Directed by: Chris Atkins
- Produced by: Nicky Bentham
- Edited by: Claire Ferguson
- Release date: September 2021 (Fantastic Fest)
- Running time: 88 minutes
- Country: United Kingdom
- Language: English

Who Killed the KLF? is a 2021 documentary film by Chris Atkins about The KLF.

The unauthorised documentary includes reconstructions of the band's dramatic gestures, played by actors. KLF members Jimmy Cauty and Bill Drummond refused to take part in the film or to authorise it. However, old interviews with them, recorded on audio cassettes, were used. Limited clips of their music were included under the fair dealing copyright exception. The KLF originally sought to block the film's release due to alleged copyright infringement, but later approved of the film.

== Cast ==
- Jimmy Cauty as self (archive footage; voice)
- Carl Cox as self
- Bill Drummond as self (archive footage; voice)
- John Higgs as self
- Alan Moore as self
- Paul Oakenfold as self

== Reception ==
The film received positive reviews. The Guardian gave it four stars, saying it was "a very entertaining guide through what has to be the strangest A-list pop career of modern times". Likewise, The Times also gave the film four stars. The Hollywood Reporter also praised the documentary, describing it as "highly entertaining".

== Trivia ==
Director Chris Atkins had been working on the film since 2009, however production was halted after he received a five–year prison sentence in 2016 for tax fraud. After he moved to an open prison, he had a laptop sneaked in so he could start the editing process. When Atkins was released in December 2018, he said that the piece was "a rough cut that mostly resembled a radio play, with amazing audio commentary but nothing to look at" and within three weeks, he began to film reconstructions.
