= Coalition (film) =

2015 British television film

- Promotional image. From left to right: Mark Dexter as David Cameron, Bertie Carvel as Nick Clegg and Ian Grieve as Gordon Brown
- Genre: Political drama
- Based on: 2010 general election 2010 United Kingdom government formation
- Written by: James Graham
- Directed by: Alex Holmes
- Starring: Bertie Carvel; Mark Dexter; Ian Grieve; Sebastian Armesto; Mark Gatiss; Donald Sumpter
- Theme music composer: Samuel Sim
- Country of origin: United Kingdom
- Original language: English
- No. of episodes: 1

Production
- Producers: Sarah Curtis; Dixie Linder
- Running time: 95 minutes (with advertisements)

Original release
- Network: Channel 4
- Release: 28 March 2015

Coalition is a 2015 British television film about the formation of a coalition government following the 2010 general election. It was broadcast on Channel 4 on 28 March 2015, shortly before that year's general election. The film was written by James Graham and starred Bertie Carvel as Nick Clegg, Ian Grieve as Gordon Brown, and Mark Dexter as David Cameron. Graham wrote the film in the aim of giving humanity and enabling empathy to all of the figures portrayed within it, which earned it positive reviews from critics.

== Plot ==
Nick Clegg is popular with the electorate ahead of the 2010 general election, with his Liberal Democrat party promising electoral reform and an end to the dominance of the two main parties, Labour and Conservative, who had led every British government since 1922. The election results in the first hung parliament since 1974, with no party having a majority of seats. The Conservatives are the largest party, then Labour, followed by the Liberal Democrats in third place. Nick is disappointed that his popularity did not reflect in the results, but is consoled by his party's former leader, Paddy Ashdown.

As the party with the most seats, the Conservatives led by David Cameron are given the first chance to form a government, which will either be a minority government or a coalition with the Liberal Democrats. Conservative peers are vehemently opposed to working with the Liberal Democrats due to what they see to be contrasting policies, but Shadow Chancellor George Osborne tells David that if they ally with them, it would put the Tories into a centrist position and potentially make them more electable for the next general election. Meanwhile, Labour, led by incumbent prime minister Gordon Brown, prepare for negotiations with the Liberal Democrats. Gordon points out to Nick that both parties are left-wing and progressive, but Nick is held back by the personal unpopularity of Brown amongst the British public.

Liberal Democrat MPs meet with their Conservative counterparts to negotiate a possible government, discussing the possibility of a referendum on electoral reform. Conservative peers are furious with Cameron on this proposal, stating that reform would end any future possibility of a Conservative majority government. However, he convinces them by saying that a Labour—Liberal Democrat coalition would pass electoral reform without a referendum, as both parties support it. In another meeting, Gordon tries to win over Nick by promising to resign during their first term in government, but Nick wants it sooner.

Gordon resigns for the good of his party and to leave in a dignified way, strategically forcing David Cameron into becoming prime minister in a minority government. Nick is adamant to form a coalition as he sees Labour as unpopular after thirteen years in government. His MPs are angry with the possibility of a coalition with the Conservatives, due to the opposition between the two parties. However, Paddy Ashdown makes a speech saying that this is the best opportunity for the party to enter government and execute their policies. The Conservatives and Liberal Democrats form a coalition.

== Cast ==
Actor	Role	Party	Notes
Mark Dexter	David Cameron	Conservative	Party leader and Leader of the Opposition who becomes the new prime minister
Sebastian Armesto	George Osborne	Conservative	Shadow Chancellor of the Exchequer who becomes the new chancellor of the exchequer
Michael Cochrane	Senior Conservative MP	Conservative	
Alex Avery	William Hague	Conservative	Former party leader and Leader of the Opposition who becomes the new Foreign Secretary
Andrew Bone	Andrew Coulson	Conservative	Director of communications
Ian Grieve	Gordon Brown	Labour	Party leader and incumbent prime minister before his resignation
Mark Gatiss	Peter Mandelson	Labour	Peer and cabinet member
Deborah Findlay	Harriet Harman	Labour	Deputy party leader who becomes acting leader
Nicholas Burns	Ed Balls	Labour	Secretary of State for Children, Schools and Families who becomes the new Shadow Secretary of State for Education
Bertie Carvel	Nick Clegg	Liberal Democrat	Party leader who becomes the new deputy prime minister
Donald Sumpter	Paddy Ashdown	Liberal Democrat	Peer and former party leader
Richard Teverson	David Laws	Liberal Democrat	Member of parliament who becomes the new Chief Secretary to the Treasury
Chris Larkin	Danny Alexander	Liberal Democrat	Member of parliament who becomes the new Secretary of State for Scotland
Rob Vowles	Chris Huhne	Liberal Democrat	MP who resigns amidst controversy
Nick Holder	Patrick McLoughlin	Conservative	MP who served as Chief Whip and Transport Secretary
Terry Diab	Susan Nye	Labour	Labour Party official and peer
Duncan Wisbey	Stewart Wood	Labour	Peer
Steve Conway	Edward Llewellyn	n/a (Civil Service)	Downing Street Chief of Staff
David Annen	Gus O'Donnell	n/a (Civil Service)	Cabinet Secretary
Adam James	Jeremy Heywood	n/a (Civil Service)	Cabinet Secretary
Sally Scott	Samantha Cameron	Conservative	Wife of David Cameron
Marta Barrio	Miriam Clegg	Liberal Democrat	Wife of Nick Clegg
Caroline Fitzgerald	Sarah Brown	Labour	Wife of Gordon Brown

== Production ==
The film was written by James Graham, who also scripted This House, a National Theatre play about the government of James Callaghan from 1976 to 1979. Graham chose to dramatise the formation of the government in 2010 because "The personalities, clashes, the farcical nature of some of it, the loss of dignity – it was characterful and weird. The lack of sleep, the pressure, and exhaustion make it exciting ... It's really important to me to try and humanise them". He stated that the message of the film was not to change political opinions, but to encourage empathy towards politicians because "There's this presumption that they're all corrupt and incompetent – but I'd love people to empathise with the incredible situation".

The film was sponsored by Japanese car manufacturer Lexus.

== Reception ==
Kasia Delgado of Radio Times praised the film for managing "to make the most powerful men in the country seem both ridiculous, and entirely human", calling it "like The Thick of It on valium".

In the New Statesman, Anoosh Chakelian wrote that it "starts off as satire and ends as an opera. It is the young playwright's eye for detail and evident reams of source material that allow for such an astute commentary, and human portrayal", while also being "masterfully unbiased; the one clear lesson to the audience is that our politicians are humans". She singled out the best performance to be Gatiss as Mandelson, as the "darkly frivolous" performance "has the macabre silliness spot on".

Lucy Mangan of The Guardian stated that her opinion of the film was prejudiced by opinions on the politicians portrayed within it, but wrote that it gave a new image to them when "bloodless freaks began to swell with life and humanity".

When commenting on the actors, GQ writer Ian McGurk praised the range of the portrayal of Brown by Grieve but reserved highest praise for Mark Dexter as Cameron, citing Dexter's striking physical similarity to the real Cameron and adding that "He also gives the best performance".

== See also ==
- Ballot Monkeys, Channel 4 sitcom broadcast during the same season
- UKIP: The First 100 Days, Channel 4 mockumentary broadcast during the same season
- Newzoids, series 1 ran during the same season
