= Ruaraidh Murray =

Scottish actor

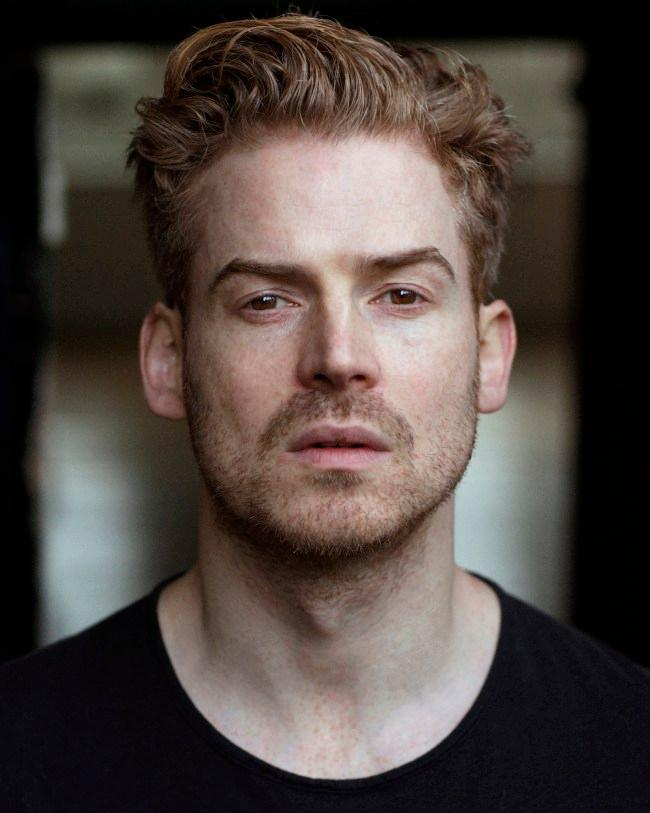
Ruaraidh Murray in 2016

Ruaraidh Murray (born 18 September 1975) is a Scottish actor, writer, and comedian.

== Early life ==
Murray was born in Edinburgh, Scotland to Fiona (née Grant) and Graeme Murray. Raised in Stockbridge, Edinburgh, he was educated at Stockbridge Primary School and Broughton High School before studying drama at the Oxford School of Drama. Murray was also a member of the Traverse Theatre and Royal Court Theatre’s Young Writers Group.

== Career ==
=== Acting ===
Murray's acting career began at age 10, when he starred opposite John Hannah, Stratford Johns, and James Cosmo in the Channel 4 TV series Brond, directed by Michael Caton-Jones.

Murray's theatre roles include playing Tommy in the 2006 No. 1 UK Tour of Irvine Welsh’s Trainspotting, performing in such venues as King's Theatre, Edinburgh, Dundee Repertory Theatre, His Majesty's Theatre, Aberdeen, Grand Opera House, Belfast, Sherman Theatre Cardiff, Birmingham Repertory Theatre, The Lowry Manchester, Oxford Playhouse, Leicester Haymarket Theatre, Theatre Royal, Bath and the Hackney Empire London.

Murray played the role of Nicky in Time Out London's Critics Choice play Disintegration at the award-winning Union Theatre, London; the role of Scott in Time Out London's Critics Choice play We’re All Doing also at the Union Theatre, London; the role of Magadus in award-winning Tom Kempinski’s play High Jumpers at the New End Theatre, Award-winning King's Head Theatre's; and the role of Jim and Adam Kruger in Lord Arthur's Bed Kruger in F*cked.com at the award-winning Traverse Theatre.

In 2016, Murray became the face of Paddy Power in the widely circulated Scotland's 2016 Euro Anthem spot directed by Academy Award Nominated Peter Cattaneo. Murray's other commercial work includes working with Coca Cola, McDonald's, Evian, Wrigley's Big Red, Fanta, Vodafone, BT Cellnet, Ikea, Boots, Party Poker, and Old Speckled Hen.

In 2017, Murray narrated the Codemasters video game Dirt 4. Murray's video game voice work also includes Ubisoft's Magic & Magic Heroes VII, playing hero Bart Brimstone.

=== Actor/writer ===
In 2014, Diana Rigg saw Boxman at the Edinburgh Festival Fringe and awarded Murray the top festival prize. Murray also performed in Big Sean, Mikey and Me and Bath Time live at Soho Radio London in 2015.

Murray is also known for writing dark comedies incorporating strong Scottish themes, with Allie being Murray's first drama. He played a fishmonger in the 2020 movie "Then Came You".

== Reception ==
Alex Eades said in his 4-star The List review of Murray's play, The Club, starring Murray and English actor Mark Farrelly, "The performances are magnetic, sparking a wonderful chemistry in this exhilarating and utterly intoxicating razor-sharp dark comedy."

BBC critic Robert Jackman's 5-star review of Irvine Welsh's play Trainspotting said of Murray's performance: "Welsh's wit is transferred perfectly to stage as Renton and Tommy's blend of horror and humour reaches almost schizophrenic level. However, the self-denial and delusion of Ruaraidh Murray's Tommy makes his decline even more harrowing."
