= Robin Oake =

Manx chief constable

Robin Oake QPM (born 1937) is the former Chief Constable of the Isle of Man Constabulary and before that Assistant Chief Constable of Greater Manchester Police.

Chief Constable of the Isle of Man from 1986 to 1999, he was succeeded by Mike Culverhouse and is the father of Detective Constable Stephen Oake, who was stabbed to death while attempting to arrest an Al Qaeda suspect. Although nominated for the George Cross, his son was awarded the Queen's Gallantry Medal. Oake wrote the book Father Forgive: The Forgotten 'F' Word following his son's murder. Robin is a strong evangelical Christian, like Stephen Oake was, and publicly forgave his son's murderer.

Oake serves as Chairman of the Isle of Man Commonwealth Games Association.
