= 2010 United Kingdom government formation =

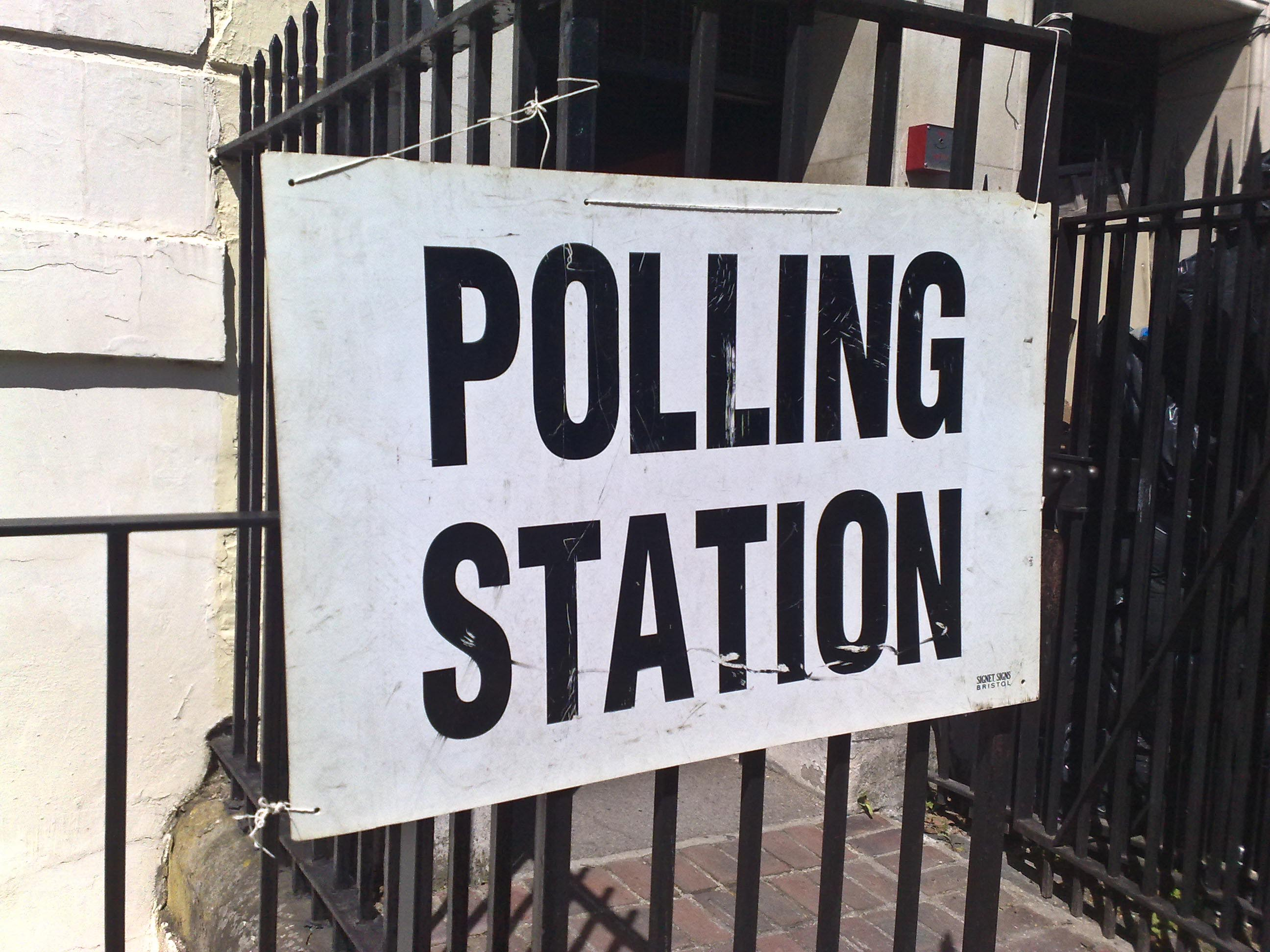
- A polling station in Camberwell, London on 6 May 2010.
- Date: 7 May 2010 – 12 May 2010
- Location: London, England, United Kingdom
- Cause: Hung parliament following the 2010 general election
- Participants: David Cameron; George Osborne; William Hague; Oliver Letwin; Ed Llewellyn; Nick Clegg; Chris Huhne; Danny Alexander; Andrew Stunell; David Laws; Gordon Brown; Peter Mandelson; Harriet Harman; The Lord Adonis; Ed Miliband; Ed Balls
- Outcome: Resignation of Gordon Brown as Leader of the Labour Party and Prime Minister; Conservative–Liberal Democrat coalition agreement; Cameron–Clegg coalition; Cameron premiership; 2010 Labour Party leadership election

The events surrounding the formation of the United Kingdom's government in 2010 took place between 7 May and 12 May 2010, following the 2010 general election, which failed to produce an overall majority for either of the country's two main political parties. The election, held on 6 May, resulted in the first hung parliament in the UK in 36 years, sparking a series of negotiations which would form the first coalition government since the Second World War.

The governing Labour administration led by Gordon Brown was defeated in the election and lost its overall majority after 13 years in office, but continued in office in an acting capacity until a government could be formed. The opposition Conservative Party led by David Cameron, won the largest number of seats in the new Parliament, but fell short of the number required to secure an overall majority. Consequently, senior figures from both parties embarked on a series of meetings with representatives from the Liberal Democrats led by Nick Clegg, aimed at forming a coalition government.

As leader of the third largest party, Clegg had announced that the Liberal Democrats would enter talks with whichever party held the greater number of seats. A series of meetings with the Conservatives began shortly after the hung parliament was announced, and continued over the weekend after the election. Negotiations were also held with the Labour Party. The Scottish National Party signalled its willingness to join Labour and the Liberal Democrats and other minor parties in government as part of a progressive rainbow coalition, but it quickly became clear that Gordon Brown's continued presence as Prime Minister was seen as a major obstacle to formulating a Labour–Liberal Democrat deal.

Although Brown relinquished his role as Labour leader on 10 May, the party failed to reach an agreement with the Liberal Democrats; the latter instead struck a deal with the Conservatives the following day. Brown resigned as Prime Minister and Labour Leader on the evening of 11 May, and the Conservative–Liberal Democrat coalition government led by David Cameron took office shortly thereafter. The Liberal Democrats emerged from a meeting of their Parliamentary party and Federal Executive to announce that the coalition deal had been "approved overwhelmingly" shortly after midnight on 12 May, and later the same day the two parties published the Conservative–Liberal Democrat coalition agreement setting out the terms of their deal. While Cameron became Prime Minister, Liberal Democrat leader Nick Clegg was appointed as Deputy Prime Minister.

== Background ==
The Labour Party came into government under the leadership of Tony Blair in May 1997 following the electoral wipeout of the Conservative government, led by John Major; this ended 18 years of Conservative rule. Having secured a landslide victory with 418 seats in the House of Commons, the party had a working majority of 179 seats, and went on to win the 2001 and 2005 elections. During its first term in office Blair's government introduced many popular policies, including legislation to establish a national minimum wage, reducing the length of hospital waiting lists, and devolving lawmaking powers to Scotland and Wales. Blair also played a key role in the Northern Ireland peace process. His decision to commit British troops to the 2003 invasion of Iraq turned public opinion against him and lost him the support of some of his own MPs. When Blair stepped down as Prime Minister in June 2007, he was succeeded by his chancellor, Gordon Brown. Blair's decade-long premiership had been a time of economic boom for the United Kingdom, but Brown's tenure as Prime Minister was dominated by the global recession of the latter part of the 2000s. Although commentators perceived Brown to have made some good decisions during the economic crisis, such as providing financial aid to several UK banks which found themselves in difficulty, the recapitalisation of the banks lead to a massive rise in national debt as the private debt accumulated by the banks became public. He was also viewed by the media as someone who lacked interpersonal skills. Another major event that occurred during Brown's time in government was the 2009 scandal involving MPs expenses, which damaged the public's trust in politicians.

By April 2010, almost five years had passed since the previous general election (held on 5 May 2005), requiring a fresh election to take place. On 6 April 2010, Brown went to Buckingham Palace to ask the Queen to dissolve Parliament on 12 April in preparation for a general election. In a press conference broadcast live from Downing Street, Brown announced the election would be held on 6 May. The time between the announcement of the election and the dissolution of Parliament, known as wash-up, was to allow for the handling of any unfinished legislative business before the Parliamentary session's conclusion.

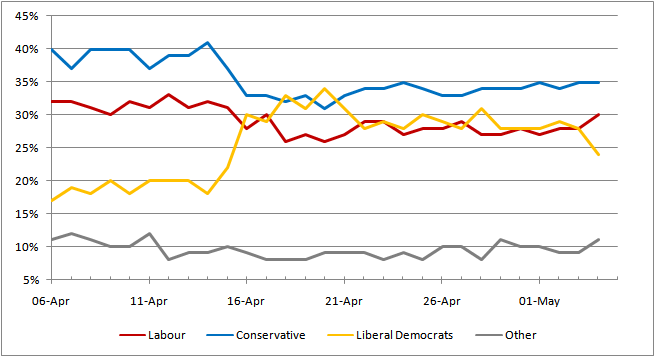
A graph of YouGov poll results during the 2010 election campaign. Conservatives are shown in blue, Labour in red, Liberal Democrats in yellow and all other parties in grey.

Labour campaigned to secure a fourth consecutive term in office and to restore support lost since 1997, while the Conservative Party sought to gain a dominant position in British politics after losses in the 1990s, and to replace Labour as the governing party. The Liberal Democrats hoped to make gains from both sides, and possibly hold the balance of power in a hung parliament. Following the televised debates between the three leaders – the first of their type during an election campaign in the United Kingdom – their poll ratings had risen to the point where many considered the possibility of a Liberal Democrat role in Government. While Cameron and Clegg were generally well received by the viewers of the three debates, Brown's performance was considered to have been less successful. Brown's image was further harmed when he privately described Gillian Duffy, a 65-year-old pensioner, as a "bigoted woman" after she raised the issue of benefits and immigration with him during a campaign trip to Rochdale, Greater Manchester. His remarks were recorded by a Sky News microphone he was still wearing as he was driven away from the visit, and were widely broadcast.

Polls just before election day showed a slight swing from the Liberal Democrats back to Labour and the Conservatives, with most of final polls falling within one point of Conservatives 36%, Labour 28%, Liberal Democrats 27%. However, record numbers of undecided voters raised uncertainty about the outcome. The Scottish National Party (SNP), encouraged by its victory in the 2007 Scottish Parliament elections, set itself a target of returning 20 MPs and hoped to find itself holding a balance of power. Equally, Plaid Cymru sought gains in Wales. In Northern Ireland, the Democratic Unionist Party (DUP) aimed to maintain or increase its number of seats, having been the fourth largest party in the House of Commons. Smaller parties which had had successes at local elections and the 2009 European elections (UK Independence Party, Green Party, British National Party) aimed to extend their representation to seats in the House of Commons.

== The election ==
The general election was held on Thursday 6 May 2010 and saw an increase in voter turnout from 61% in 2005 to 65% in 2010. Throughout the day GfK NOP and Ipsos MORI conducted an exit poll on behalf of the BBC, Sky and ITV news services – the results of which were announced as the polls closed at 10:00 pm. Data gathered from individuals at 130 polling stations around the country suggested a hung parliament, with an initial estimate that the Conservative Party would achieve 307 seats – 19 seats short of a controlling majority. This deficit was later adjusted to 21 seats. The distribution of seats was initially predicted to be 307 to the Conservatives, 255 to Labour, 59 to the Liberal Democrats and 29 to the other parties, but these figures were later updated with a minor adjustment in Labour's favour. The apparently poor prospects for the Liberal Democrats were a surprise to commentators, as many previous opinion polls had indicated they would receive more seats. A later BBC exit poll published at 5:36 am on Friday 7 May predicted the Conservatives on 306, 20 short of an overall majority, with Labour on 262, and the Liberal Democrats on 55.

At 9:41am on 7 May, the BBC confirmed a "hung parliament", as it was by then impossible for the Conservative party to gain the number of seats needed to form a majority government. 326 seats were required for a technical majority, but only 323 were necessary for a practical majority, as the five Sinn Féin MPs were expected to boycott the House of Commons. At that time the Conservatives stood at 290 seats, Labour at 247 and Liberal Democrats at 51. The final results put the Conservatives on 306 seats, Labour on 258, and the Liberal Democrats on 57.

The make-up of the House of Commons following the 2010 general election. No party achieved an overall majority.

Of the 532 seats contested in England, the Conservatives won an absolute majority of 61 seats and secured an average swing of 5.6% from Labour. The last seat to be elected, Thirsk and Malton, was contested on 27 May because one of the candidates died. All of Scotland's 59 seats were won by the parties that won them at the 2005 election, with Labour regaining the two seats they lost in by-elections since 2005. Labour increased its share of the vote by 2.5% and the Conservatives by 0.9%, giving a swing from the Conservatives to Labour of 0.8%. The Conservatives won only one Scottish constituency, while the SNP – which had hoped to increase its share of seats from seven to 20 – failed to make any headway.

40 seats were contested in Wales, where the Conservative share rose from three seats to eight, taking one from the Liberal Democrats and four from Labour. Welsh nationalist party Plaid Cymru gained one extra seat, Arfon, from Labour. Overall, Labour lost four seats but remained the biggest party in Wales with 26 seats. 18 seats were contested in Northern Ireland, where both Irish nationalist parties, Sinn Féin and the SDLP, held their seats, the unionist UUP (in an electoral pact with the Conservatives) lost their only seat and the DUP lost a seat. This left the nationalist parties with eight seats, the unionist parties with eight seats (all DUP), the Alliance Party with one seat and an independent unionist with one seat. It was the first time since the Partition of Ireland that unionist parties had failed to secure a majority of Northern Ireland's Westminster seats in a general election.

== Initial statements and negotiations ==
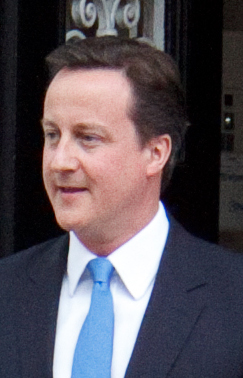
Conservative leader David Cameron seen leaving St Stephen's Club on the afternoon of 7 May 2010, the day his party began negotiations with the Liberal Democrats to form a government.

With no single party having achieved an overall majority, the 2010 general election resulted in the first hung parliament since 1974. When it became clear that no party would achieve the outright majority needed to form the next government, the three main party leaders made public statements offering to discuss the options for putting together an administration with the other parties. Liberal Democrat leader Nick Clegg called on Prime Minister Gordon Brown and Conservative leader David Cameron to act "in the national interest and not out of narrow party political advantage". However, having stated before the election that the party with the most seats should have the initial say on forming a government, Clegg announced his intention to begin talks with the Conservative Party. Speaking outside the Liberal Democrat headquarters he said: "It is now for the Conservative Party to prove that it is capable of seeking to govern in the national interest." Brown said he intended to play his part in securing "a stable, strong and principled government", and indicated his willingness to speak with both Clegg and Cameron on how to achieve this, saying: "What we have seen are no ordinary election results." But shortly after, Cameron held a press conference at which he invited the Liberal Democrats to talks, saying: "I want to make a big, open and comprehensive offer to the Liberal Democrats. I want us to work together in tackling our country's big and urgent problems - the debt crisis, our deep social problems and our broken political system."

Under the constitutional rules governing protocol in the event of a hung parliament, Brown, as the sitting prime minister, would remain in office until a new government could be formed, a process which could continue until resolution. On Brown's instructions, Cabinet Secretary Sir Gus O'Donnell had updated the protocol for dealing with a hung parliament earlier in the year. Following confirmation that no party had achieved an overall majority, Brown authorised O'Donnell to begin the process. Four-member teams of civil servants were sent to liaise with the main political parties to facilitate negotiations.

Cameron's willingness to hold talks with the Liberal Democrats was interpreted by BBC News political editor Nick Robinson as hinting at the possibility that Liberal Democrat MPs could serve as part of a Cabinet. On the afternoon of 7 May, Cameron and Clegg spoke by telephone and had what the BBC reported as a "very constructive" conversation. By that evening exploratory talks between teams of senior representatives from the Liberal Democrats and Conservatives had begun. The Liberal Democrats team consisted of Chris Huhne, Danny Alexander, Andrew Stunell and David Laws, while George Osborne, William Hague, Oliver Letwin and Ed Llewellyn made up the Conservative team.

== Further talks ==
By the morning of Saturday 8 May, talks between the Conservatives and Liberal Democrats were fully underway. A 70-minute meeting at Admiralty House in Westminster was described by both parties as being "constructive and amicable", and another meeting was scheduled for the following day. At a private meeting that evening, Cameron and Clegg held the first of a series of talks to discuss the negotiations. Members of the Liberal Democrat Parliamentary Party had earlier met at Local Government House to discuss the coalition talks.

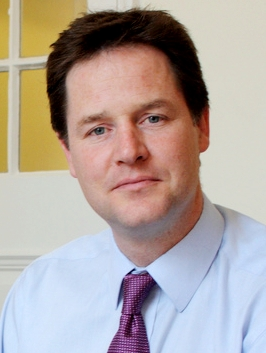
Liberal Democrat leader Nick Clegg held face-to-face talks with his Conservative counterpart.

One of the chief issues that the Liberal Democrats wished to address in any coalition agreement was that of electoral reform, and as Party members debated the negotiations, a 1,000 strong crowd of protesters from the pressure group 38 Degrees gathered outside. Amid chants of "Fair votes now" and "We want to speak to Nick", Clegg briefly left the meeting to accept a petition and told the protesters, "Reforming politics is one of the reasons I went into politics." Following the meeting, a Liberal Democrats negotiator, David Laws, said members had "endorsed in full" the strategy outlined by Clegg that the Conservatives should have first choice in negotiations on forming a government. Clegg also met with the party's federal executive, which also endorsed Clegg's decision.

8 May 2010 was the 65th anniversary of VE Day – which marked the victory of the Allied Forces over Nazi Germany and the end of the Second World War in Europe – and celebrations were held to mark the occasion. The leaders of all three parties attended a ceremony at the Cenotaph in Whitehall. After the ceremony, Brown flew to his family home in Scotland, but remained ready to negotiate with the Liberal Democrats if no deal with the Conservatives was reached. Labour denied reports of a heated telephone conversation between Brown and Clegg, and support among Brown's Cabinet colleagues remained strong, but one backbencher, John Mann, urged Brown to step aside as Labour leader before the party conference in September, arguing that Brown's continued leadership "rules out the credibility of a Lib/Lab pact".

== Negotiations continue ==
On Sunday 9 May, senior negotiators from the Liberal Democrats and Conservatives embarked on six hours of talks at the Cabinet Office, which were described as "very positive and productive". William Hague emerged from the discussions to say, "The issues that we have covered have included political reform, economic issues and reduction of the deficit, banking reform, civil liberties, environmental issues. So, we've had good discussions about all of those areas. We are agreed that a central part of any agreement that we make will be economic stability and the reduction of the budget deficit, but each negotiating team is now going to report to our party leaders."

As the negotiations were taking place, Gordon Brown returned to Downing Street and held a meeting with Nick Clegg at the Foreign Office. A Downing Street spokesman later confirmed the talks, together with the previous evening's telephone conversation between Brown and Clegg, which was described as "an amicable discussion." However, Paddy Ashdown – a previous Liberal Democrat leader – offered a different view of the Brown-Clegg conference call, telling the BBC it "was a diatribe, a rant, and that Gordon Brown was threatening in his approach to Nick Clegg." Following the success of the talks between their two parties, Clegg and Cameron held a second round of face-to-face discussions at Westminster that evening, lasting 45 minutes.

While negotiations continued to form the next administration, the business of government continued with the previous incumbents. (Note: This included ministers who no longer held seats in Parliament; their government roles continued until a new administration could be formed.) In this respect Chancellor Alistair Darling flew to Brussels to attend a meeting of European finance ministers. In London, Brown held meetings with Business Secretary Peter Mandelson, his deputy leader Harriet Harman, Secretary of State for Energy Ed Miliband and Tony Blair's former special adviser Alastair Campbell. Brown also sent an email to party activists in which he thanked them for their work during the election campaign. It concluded "The past few days have seen us enter a political landscape not considered possible a few short weeks ago - with the outcome of the election leading to no single party able to form a majority government. My duty as prime minister has been to seek to resolve this situation." Several senior Labour backbenchers, including MP George Howarth called on Brown to step down.

== Labour enters the picture ==
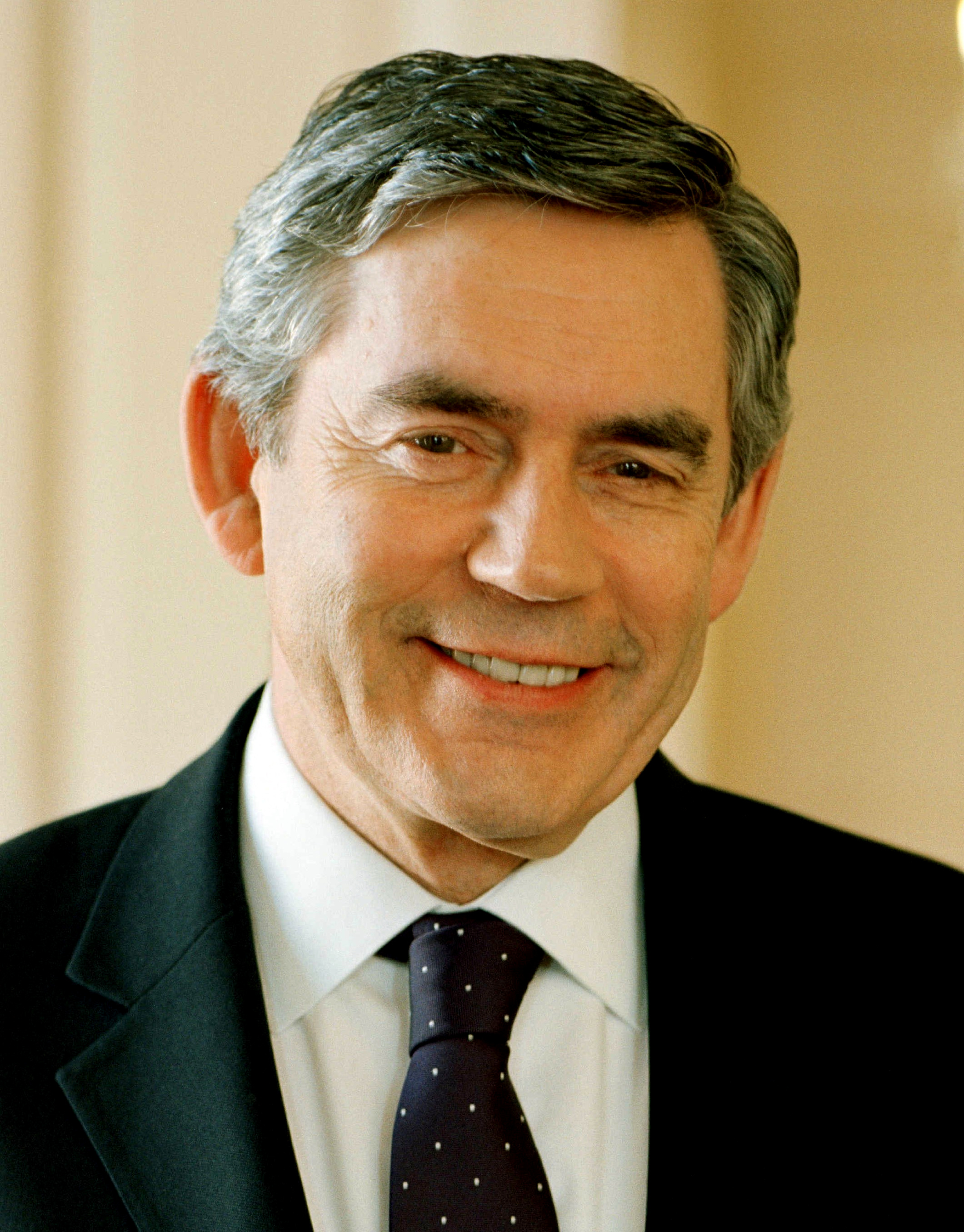
Labour leader Gordon Brown was seen as a major stumbling block to forming a coalition with the Liberal Democrats.

Monday 10 May saw another day of talks between the Conservatives and Liberal Democrats, but at a meeting with his MPs, Nick Clegg was urged to give assurances over offers which were being made by David Cameron's team. They also wished him to continue negotiations with Labour. During the day it emerged that senior Labour and Liberal Democrat representatives had held discussions about forming a coalition, but that one of the barriers to this was the continued presence of Gordon Brown as prime minister. At 5:00 pm that afternoon Brown announced that he would step down as Labour leader by September. In a statement he said that he intended to "[A]sk the Labour Party to set in train the processes needed for its own leadership election." The statement went on to say, "I would hope that it would be completed in time for the new leader to be in post by the time of the Labour Party conference. I will play no part in that contest, I will back no individual candidate." He also urged any prospective candidates for the position to wait until coalition negotiations were complete before announcing their candidacy. Following this announcement, formal talks began between Labour and the Liberal Democrats, with Labour's negotiating team consisting of Peter Mandelson, Harriet Harman, Andrew Adonis, Ed Miliband and Ed Balls. However, many in Labour felt that a coalition with the Liberal Democrats was an unrealistic prospect since it would still fall short of the 326 seats needed to form a majority government, with 315 seats to the Conservatives' 306. Labour MP Graham Stringer said, "I don't think it makes sense in the arithmetic – the numbers don't add up." However, in his account of Labour's negotiations with the Liberal Democrats, Andrew Adonis – who participated in the talks – writes that the general consensus among members of Gordon Brown's cabinet was that talks between the Conservatives and Liberal Democrats would reach an impasse. "[The] process would turn to our favour once the Tories and Lib Dems had rehearsed the extent of their differences".

With Labour now attempting to form its own coalition government, the Conservatives promised the Liberal Democrats a referendum on changing the voting mechanism to the alternative vote (AV) system. In response Labour said that it would introduce AV then hold a public referendum to approve it. In a statement outlining his decision to negotiate with Labour, Clegg said that although his party had made progress with the Conservatives, they had not "reached a comprehensive partnership agreement for a full Parliament" and negotiating with Labour was the "responsible thing to do".

The possibility of some SNP involvement in a Labour-led government materialised when Angus Robertson, the SNP's leader in the House of Commons suggested its MPs would be willing to join Labour, the Liberal Democrats, Plaid Cymru and MPs from other smaller parties to form a rainbow coalition. It was reported on 10 May that a meeting to discuss this scenario was held between Robertson, the SNP Chief Whip Stewart Hosie and Cabinet Office officials the previous evening. However, Labour's Douglas Alexander said he could not foresee a situation in which Labour could enter into government with the SNP because the two parties had "fundamental differences", and he made it clear that no senior Labour officials had been approached by anyone from the SNP.

== Coalition deal reached ==
By 11 May, the possibility of a deal between the Liberal Democrats and Labour was looking unlikely. Talks between the Conservatives and Liberal Democrats continued, and after concluding that he would not be able to form a government, Brown announced his resignation that evening. He also resigned as leader of the Labour Party with immediate effect. He then left Downing Street with his wife and their children, and drove to Buckingham Palace where he tendered his resignation to the Queen and advised her to call for David Cameron. Cameron became Prime Minister one hour after the Queen accepted Brown's resignation, and arrived at Downing Street with his wife, Samantha shortly afterwards. In his first address outside 10 Downing Street, he announced his intention to form a coalition government, the first since the Second World War, with the Liberal Democrats. Cameron appointed Nick Clegg as Deputy Prime Minister. Cameron met with his MPs in the Committee Room of the House of Commons at 10:00 pm, where he was greeted with cheering that could be heard from the central hall of the Commons.

Cameron later told a BBC documentary that he had not expected to become prime minister, and the coalition agreement had not yet been completed when Brown resigned. Speaking on the programme, Five Days That Changed Britain, broadcast on 29 July, he said that when he went to meet the Queen at Buckingham Palace, the coalition deal had not been finalised. Formally, the monarch can only invite a prospective Prime Minister to form a government; the shape of the government is for the new prime minister to decide. William Hague said that as Cameron travelled to the Palace, the coalition agreement was still being completed and signed.

Shortly after midnight on 12 May 2010, the Liberal Democrats emerged from a meeting of their Parliamentary party and Federal Executive to announce that the coalition deal had been "approved overwhelmingly", meaning that David Cameron would lead a coalition government of Conservatives and Liberal Democrats. Later that day, the two parties jointly published the Conservative – Liberal Democrat coalition agreement specifying the terms of the deal. Cameron appointed his first Cabinet, which included several senior Conservative and Liberal Democrat figures. From the Conservatives, George Osborne became Chancellor of the Exchequer, William Hague was named as Foreign Secretary as well as the honorary title of First Secretary of State and Oliver Letwin was appointed as Minister of State for the Cabinet Office. Liberal Democrat appointments included Danny Alexander as Secretary of State for Scotland, Chris Huhne as Secretary of State for Energy and Climate Change, David Laws as Chief Secretary to the Treasury and Vince Cable became Secretary of State for Business, Innovation & Skills and President of the Board of Trade.

Cameron and Clegg gave their first joint press conference in the Downing Street Rose Garden on the afternoon of 12 May, telling journalists the purpose of their government would be "[T]o give our country the strong, stable and decisive leadership we need". The new Parliamentary session began with the State Opening of Parliament on 25 May. Cameron attended his first Prime Minister's Questions as Prime Minister on Wednesday 2 June.

Labour became the party of opposition, and with Brown's departure, Harriet Harman became its acting leader. On 18 May 2010 Labour's National Executive Committee announced the details of the leadership election. Ed Miliband was elected as the party's new leader at its annual national conference on 25 September 2010.

== See also ==
- Coalition (film), 2015 television film about the formation of the coalition government
