= Mike Culverhouse =

Mike Culverhouse was Chief Constable of the Isle of Man Constabulary from 1999 until his retirement on 31 December 2007. He took over as Chief Constable following the retirement of Robin Oake QPM and was the first ever Chief Constable of the Isle of Man to be appointed who did not previously hold ACPO (i.e. Assistant, Deputy or full Chief Constable) rank, previously being a Chief Superintendent in the Merseyside Police.

== Criticisms and controversies ==
Culverhouse has been widely criticised for his tough stance on alleged corruption and internal discipline. As such he was taken to court by his former deputy Neil Kinrade over the Manx Bugging Scandal and other matters, and has been repeatedly criticised on the floor of Tynwald by John Houghton MHK, a strong Police critic. Culverhouse was the subject of up to 10 complaints by former and serving officers which were investigated by the Chief Constable of Hampshire Constabulary but no action was taken.

Culverhouse was also controversial in his appointment of non-Manx Senior Officers including Mike Langdon as Deputy who took over as Chief Constable.

While proclaiming in the local press that illegal bugging had been taking place (see the Bugging Scandal) it was decided that it was not then in the public interest to publish the results of the Cheshire police's investigation, which failed to substantiate any of the claims made. However, in August 2006 the Interception of Communications Tribunal made an Order that found that warrants applied for by Culverhouse for telephone bugging were unlawful. Despite a strenuous appeal by Culverhouse and the Attorney General, John Cortlett, the Isle of Man Appeal Court found in favour of the Tribunal and upheld the Tribunal's Order. The evidence in the case raised concerns as to the procedures adopted by the Chief Constable, the Attorney General and the then Chief Minister in dealing with phone tapping. The victim of the bugging, ex-Inspector Simon Graley currently has an application before the European Court of Human Rights in Strasbourg in relation to the unlawful bugging of his telephone. A complaint against Culverhouse is being considered by the Police Complaints Commissioner as to his conduct in this matter.

In April 2008 the Interception Tribunal made a further ruling that warrants to tap the telephone of another police officer were unlawful. Despite this being the second such ruling the Isle of Man authorities remain silent. Two confidential reports have now been submitted to the Governor in Council, which is basically the Governor sitting in concert with the Council of Ministers. The head of the Council of Ministers is the Chief Minister. It was the then Chief Minister who signed the warrants in 2003. The legal adviser to the Council of Ministers is the Attorney General. It is the Attorney General who provides an independent safeguard within the interception legislation.

The matter of ex-Inspector Graley's application to the Strasbourg Court continues with the UK, as the contracting party to the convention, expected to respond to the Court by late July 2008. The matter is published on the Court's public website, at the following link: http://cmiskp.echr.coe.int/tkp197/view.asp?action=html&documentId=829289&portal=hbkm&source=externalbydocnumber&table=F69A27FD8FB86142BF01C1166DEA398649

Since that publication further papers have been submitted drawing the Court's attention to the findings of the Police Complaints Commissioner in the investigations into Mike Culverhouse. The Commissioner opined that Mike Culverhouse had not made sufficient enquiries or had sufficient information on which to base his application for the intercept warrants. In interview during the investigation Culverhouse claimed that he had discussed the application for warrants against Graley with the Attorney General personally. Graley's argument before the Strasbourg Court is that the Attorney General should have no part to play with the investigators if he is to act as a safeguard for the potential target of a warrant, and that the legislation is not compatible with the convention.

The United Kingdom has now admitted that Graley's Article 8 Rights were breached by the actions of the Chief Minister of the Isle of Man on the advice of the Isle of Man Attorney General. The Interceptions of Communications Tribunal on the Isle of Man found in favour of a second applicant, Toby Neale, a serving police officer, that a warrant to intercept his communications was unlawful, and the United Kingdom also admitted a similar breach there. Another retired police officer, Roger Thomson, applied to the Strasbourg Court in respect of his telephone calls being intercepted. All three, Graley, Neale and Thompson have received cash settlements from the Isle of Man Government in respect of damages.
