= Kurt Engfehr =

Film producer and editor (born 1962)

- Born: Kurt Robert Engfehr; August 2, 1962 (age 63); Trenton, Michigan, U.S.
- Occupations: Filmmaker; editor; producer
- Years active: 1986–present
- Spouse: Elizabeth Marcus

Kurt Robert Engfehr (/kɜrt ˈrɑbərt ɛnɡfɜr/; born August 2, 1962) is an American film producer and editor, best known for his work on Michael Moore's Oscar-winning Bowling For Columbine, for which Engfehr won the American Cinema Editors award for best documentary editing, and the Cannes Palme d'Or winning, Fahrenheit 9/11. Engfehr also received an Emmy for Best Edited Interview in 2021, for his work on an interview with Donald Trump.

== Early life and education ==
Engfehr was born in Trenton, Michigan. He grew up in the Trenton area in Detroit, next to a superfund waste site called “The Black Lagoon”, and near the BASF chemical plant where his father worked. Engfehr graduated from Trenton High School in 1980 and worked as a waiter, janitor, and part-time picking up dead bodies for a mortuary service. Engfehr attended the Henry Ford Community College, Michigan from 1983 to 1986.

== Film career ==
Through his studies at the Henry Ford Community College, Engfehr interned at WTVS PBS Channel 56 in Detroit. In 1986, Engfehr moved to Chicago, intending to attend Columbia College but running into financial difficulties. In 1987, Engfehr went on to work for a small video production company, where he filmed over 100 weddings and numerous corporate videos.

In 1991, he moved to Los Angeles and worked the midnight shift duplicating tapes for FOX's Totally Hidden Video until it was canceled. He then cycled through a series of film- and TV-adjacent jobs before meeting Elizabeth Marcus, his wife to be, and moving back to the US East Coast.

In 1994, Engfehr relocated to Brooklyn, New York, where he worked as an editor for a video production company at the post house, National Video Center, for clients such as Nature, Lifetime, the BBC, HBO, and MSNBC. He continued to work as a non-linear editor for MSNBC during its inception in 1996. He then moved to HBO, where he was a staff editor until 1998.

=== The Michael Moore Years ===
In 1998, Engfehr worked as senior editor on Michael Moore's Emmy-winning TV series, The Awful Truth, which ran on both Bravo in the US and Channel 4 in the UK. Describing himself as a “huge fan” of Moore, Engfehr had seen Roger & Me in a theater outside of Chicago and watched every episode of TV Nation.

In 2001, Moore invited Engfehr to work on his critically acclaimed documentary on the causes of gun violence, Bowling for Columbine. The initial four months turned into eighteen months, and was his first ever film he edited – a turning point in Engfehr's career. The documentary earned universal acclaim and won the 2003 Academy Award for Best Documentary Feature, the 55th Anniversary Prize at the 2002 Cannes Film Festival, among others. For his efforts on this documentary, Engfehr won the 2003 American Cinema Editors Award for Best Documentary Editing. After Columbine, Engfehr co-produced and edited Chirstophe Browne's A League of Ordinary Gentlemen, which explored the attempted resurrection of professional bowling and which was filmed around his hometown outside of Detroit.

In 2003, Engfehr and Moore worked together again on Fahrenheit 9/11, a controversial film about President George W. Bush and the post-9/11 war on terror, where he served as co-producer and editor. The film became one of the highest-grossing documentaries of all time, at $222 million worldwide.

=== Reboot Media Era ===
After working with Moore, Engfehr continued to work in documentary filmmaking, and in 2009, he co-directed The Yes Men Fix The World, which won the Audience Award at the Berlin Film Festival.

From 2008, he wrote and co-directed Fat, Sick & Nearly Dead, a comedic documentary about weight loss and self-realisation. Released in the early era of online streaming platforms in 2011, the documentary gained lots of traction, with over 20 million viewers and creating an online community of more than 1.25 million people, Reboot Your Life. Engfehr went on to direct a sequel, Fat, Sick & Nearly Dead 2 in 2014, and a film about children's health, The Kid's Menu.

=== Recent years ===
In 2016, Engfehr directed the documentary LBJ: What The Hell Is The Presidency For?, which aired on the History Channel.

In 2019, Engfehr went to work at DCTV, where he worked on the Axios on HBO news show. For his edit of the Jonathan Swan interview of US President Donald Trump in 2020, Engfehr won the Emmy for Outstanding Edited Interview in 2021.

== Film and TV works ==
Title	Role	Year
Teofilo: Boxing's Most Revolutionary Champion	Editing Consultant	2025
Democracy Under Siege	Additional Editor	2024
The Fly Collectors	Editor	2024
One Good Reason	Additional Editor	2023
How Saba Kept Singing	Consulting Editor	2023
Gulf Coast Love Story	DP/Editor	2022
Food & Country	Editorial Consultant	2022
Finding Kendrick Johnson	Ex Producer/Editor	2021
Coded Bias	Story Editor	2020
Flint	Supervising Editor	2020
Refugee	Ex Producer/Supervising Editor	2018
Free Trip To Egypt	Editor	2018
Stranger Fruit	Editor/Producer	2017
Tickling Giants	Consulting Editor	2017
The Kids Menu	Director/Writer/DP	2016
No Manifesto	Producer/Editor	2015
Fat, Sick & Nearly Dead #2	Director/Writer/DP	2014
Red Army	Editor	2014
Reject	Producer	2013
Wrenched	Co-Producer	2013
Just Do It: A Tale Of Modern-day Outlaws	Supervising Editor	2011
A People Uncounted	Editor	2011
Please Don't Beat Me, Sir!	Executive Producer	2011
Fat, Sick & Nearly Dead	Co-director & Co-writer	2010
The Yes Men Fix The World	Co-director	2009
BLAST!	Editing Consultant	2009
Bigger, Stronger, Faster	Co-producer	2008
At The Edge Of The World	Editor	2008
A Place In Time	Editor	2007
Trumbo	Co-producer/Editor	2007
Taking Liberties	Co-producer	2007
Seamless	Editor	2005
Fahrenheit 9/11	Co-Producer/Editor	2004
A League of Ordinary Gentlemen	Co-producer/Editor	2003
Bowling For Columbine	Co-producer/Editor	2002

== Personal life ==
Engfehr resides in Denville Township, New Jersey, with his wife, Elizabeth Marcus, a fellow filmmaker whom he met in Los Angeles in 1992. As well as working on Bowling For Columbine and Fahrenheit 9/11 together, the pair have collaborated on multiple projects, including No Manifesto: A Film About Manic Street Preachers.
