= Isle of Man Constabulary =

Police service of the Isle of Man

Isle of Man Constabulary Meoiryn-Shee Ellan Vannin

Agency overview
- Formed: September 1863
- Annual budget: £19 million

Jurisdictional structure
- Operations jurisdiction: Isle of Man
- Area: 572 square kilometres (221 sq mi)
- Population: 85,000
- General nature: Civilian police

Operational structure
- Headquarters: Douglas
- Sworn members: 200
- Agency executive: Russ Foster, Chief constable
- Divisions: 4

Facilities
- Stations: 4

Website
- www.iompolice.im

The Isle of Man Constabulary (Manx: Meoiryn-Shee Ellan Vannin) is the national police service of the Isle of Man, an island of 85,000 inhabitants, situated approximately equidistant from Northern Ireland, Wales, Scotland and England.

== Structures and deployment ==
The force has about 236 officers in its establishment. As the Isle of Man is not a part of the United Kingdom, the Constabulary is responsible to the Minister of Home Affairs of the Isle of Man Government. Nevertheless, the service volunteers itself for inspection by His Majesty's Inspectorate of Constabulary (HMIC) for England and Wales.

The force is split into four Neighbourhood Policing Teams (NPTs). Each NPT is controlled by an inspector who has established a partnership with the local community to help solve issues affecting the local area.

Neighbourhood Policing Teams
Team	Parishes etc. covered
Northern	Ramsey, Andreas, Bride, Ballaugh, Lezayre, Maughold, Jurby, Lonan, Laxey
Western	Patrick, German, Michael, Peel, Marown
Southern	Castletown, Port St Mary, Port Erin, Malew, Arbory, Rushen, Santon
Eastern	Borough of Douglas, Braddan, Onchan

There is a Criminal Investigation Department which includes the CID, Public Protection and pro-active teams.

A small team of intelligence and drug trafficking officers exists dedicated to this. Drug trafficking is an assigned matter to the Isle of Man Customs and Excise.

An Operational Support Group which includes operational Firearms and Training, Public Order officers, a Search Team, Negotiators and Post Incident Managers.

A major event for the force is the annual TT races.

The constabulary's headquarters are in Douglas. The present chief constable is Russ Foster.

== Uniform ==
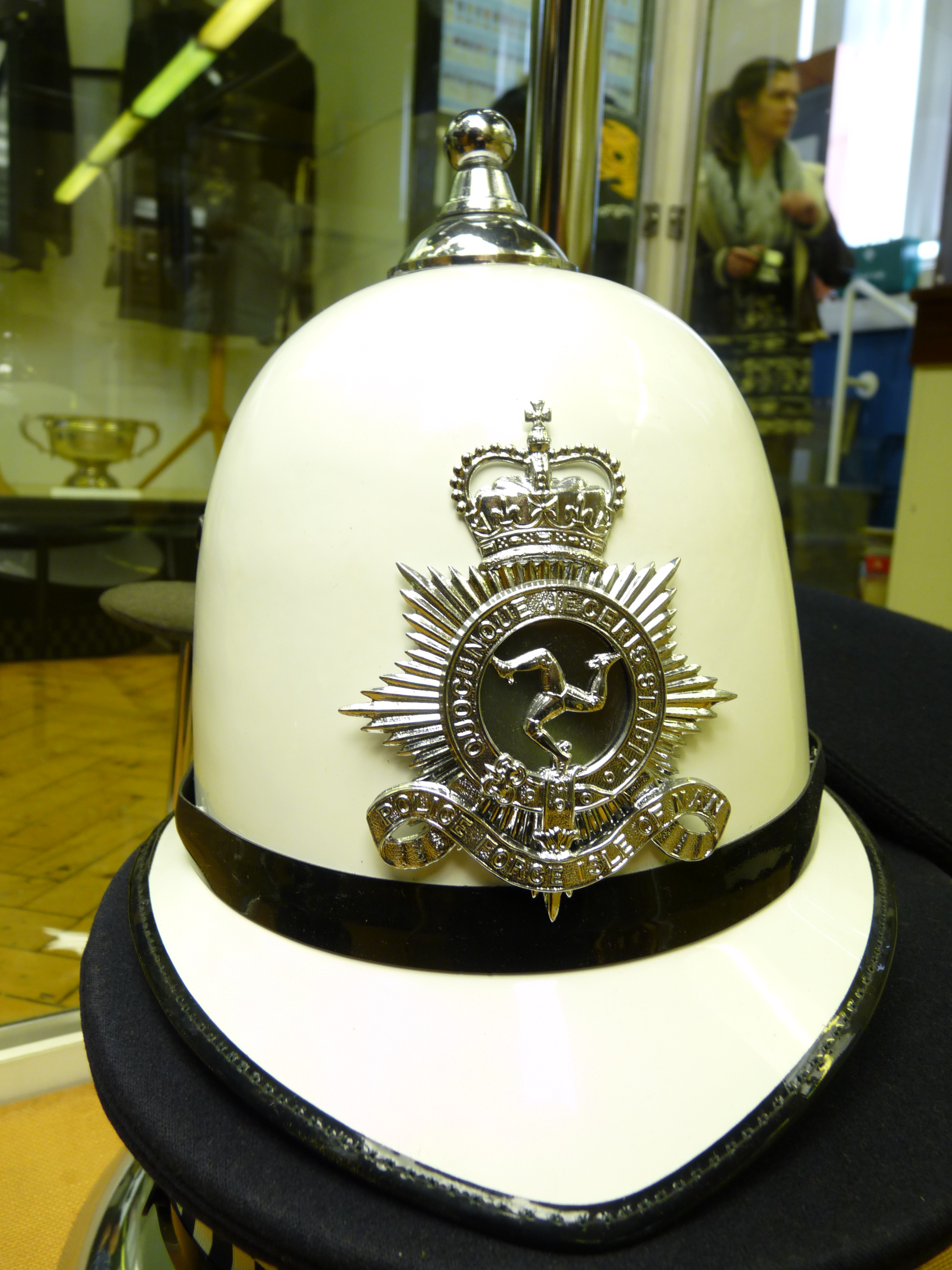
The distinctive white Isle of Man Constabulary custodian helmet.

In terms of uniform, the force looks very similar to police in the United Kingdom, apart from the Isle of Man custodian helmets worn by male constables and sergeants. White helmets were introduced in 1960 as a summer alternative to the older black helmets (partly for tourism reasons). White helmets were used as a summer option in other police forces (including Brighton, Southend-on-Sea and Swansea Borough Police forces; Peterborough City Police; the Metropolitan Police's band; and the New Zealand Police), but this practice ceased in the UK in 1969 and in New Zealand in the 1990s. The white helmet is now worn year round by officers on foot patrol. Officers on mobile patrol tend to wear peaked caps.

== Controversies ==
During the tenure of Mike Culverhouse, the force was involved in the Manx Bugging Scandal, and almost all senior officers except the chief constable were either suspended, retired or dismissed due to the uncovering of widespread bugging.

== Rank structure ==
The rank structure of the constabulary follows the practice of United Kingdom county (as opposed to metropolitan) territorial police forces, except that there are no ranks of chief superintendent or assistant chief constable. There are currently three superintendents and four chief inspectors.

Isle of Man Constabulary ranks and insignia
Rank	Chief constable	Deputy chief constable	Superintendent	Chief inspector	Inspector	Sergeant	Constable
Epaulette insignia	Isle of Man Police Chief Constable Epaulette	Isle of Man Police Deputy Chief Constable Epaulette	Isle of Man Police Superintendant Epaulette	Isle of Man Police Chief Inspector Epaulette	Isle of Man Police Inspector Epaulette	Isle of Man Police Sergeant Epaulette	Isle of Man Police Constable Epaulette

== Chief officers ==
- Russ Foster, 2023–present
- Gary Roberts, 2013–2023
- Mike Langdon, 2008–2013
- Mike Culverhouse, 1999–2007
- Robin Oake, 1986–1999
- Frank Weedon, 1972–1986
- Christopher Beaty-Pownall, 1955–1972
- Major John Young, 1936–1954
- Colonel H W Madoc, 1911–1936
- William Freeth, 1888–1911
- Lieutenant Colonel William Paul, 1878–1888

== See also ==
- Isle of Man Airport Police
