= List of terrorist incidents in Great Britain =

List of terrorist attacks that have happened in Great Britain

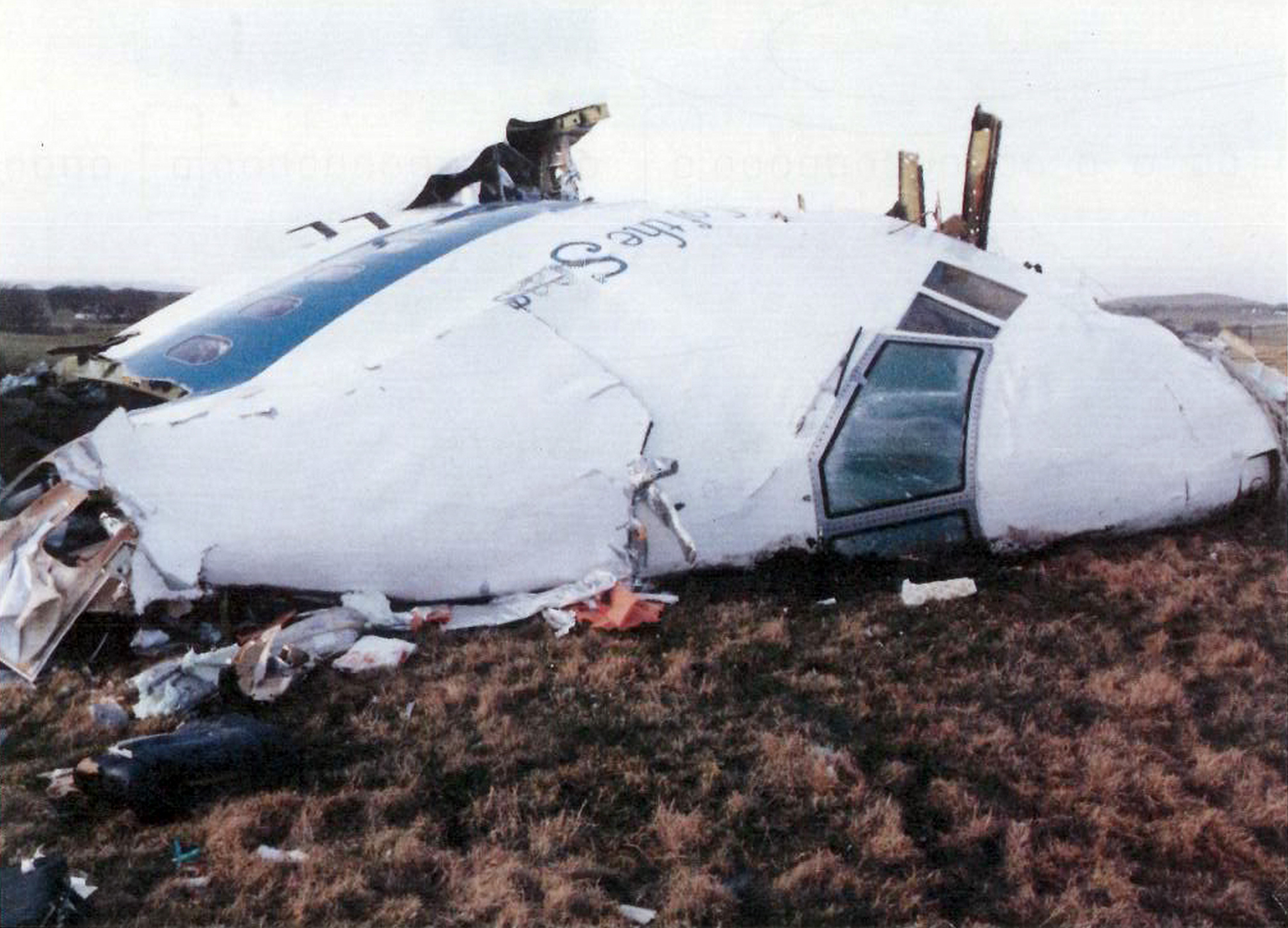
Lockerbie, 1988 - the deadliest attack in the UK

The reasons behind terrorist attacks in Great Britain are many. During the 20th century, most attacks were carried out by various Irish Republican Army (IRA) groups and were linked to the Northern Ireland conflict (the Troubles). In the late 20th century there were also isolated attacks by Middle Eastern terrorist groups, though the vast majority of the attacks were the work of the IRA and splinter groups. During the 21st century, however, most terrorist incidents in Britain have been linked to Islamic fundamentalism.

Since 1970, there have been at least 3,395 terrorist-related deaths in the UK, the highest in western Europe. The vast majority of the deaths were linked to the Northern Ireland conflict and happened in Northern Ireland. Between 1971 and 2001, there were 430 terrorist-related deaths in Great Britain. Of these, 125 deaths were linked to the Northern Ireland conflict, and 305 deaths were linked to other causes – most of the latter deaths occurred in the Lockerbie bombing.

== List ==
=== 19th century ===
- 13 December 1867: Clerkenwell explosion: members of the Irish Republican Brotherhood (IRB), nicknamed the "Fenians", detonated a bomb against the outer wall of Clerkenwell Prison, in an attempt to free one of their comrades. The explosion damaged nearby houses, killed 12 people, and caused 120 injuries.
- 1881–1885: Fenian dynamite campaign: the IRB carried out a bombing campaign against infrastructure, government, military, and police targets in Britain.
- 26 April 1897: A bomb left by an anarchist group on a Metropolitan Railway train exploded at Aldersgate Street station (now Barbican). One person, Harry Pitts, was killed and sixty were injured, ten seriously.

=== 1912–1914 ===
From 1912 to 1914, the female enfranchisement movement, the suffragettes, orchestrated a bombing and arson campaign which was described by the suffragettes themselves as terrorism. Emmeline Pankhurst said the suffragettes committed these acts to "terrorise the British public" and the Women's Social and Political Union reported their own acts as a "Reign of terror". The campaign included burning down the houses of members of the cabinet, an axe being thrown at the Prime minister, attempted bombings of train stations including with nail bombs, and attempts to flood towns by attacking water courses. C.J. Bearman asserts that there were at least 337 arson or bombing attempts and that the cost of the campaign in 2021 money amounted to 140-240 million pounds. 1300 people had been arrested and imprisoned by the end of the campaign.

=== 1939–1940 ===
From January 1939 to March 1940, the Irish Republican Army (IRA) carried out a campaign of bombing and sabotage against the civil, economic, and military infrastructure of Britain. It was known as the S-Plan or Sabotage Campaign. During the campaign, the IRA carried out almost 300 attacks and acts of sabotage in Britain, killing seven people and injuring 96. Most of the casualties occurred in the Coventry bombing on 25 August 1939.

=== 1970s ===
- 12 January 1971: Two bombs exploded at the house of government minister Robert Carr. This attack was one of 25 carried out by the Angry Brigade between August 1970 and August 1971. The Bomb Squad was established at Scotland Yard in January 1971 to target the group, and they were apprehended in August of that year.
- 31 October 1971: A bomb exploded in the Post Office Tower in London causing extensive damage but no injuries. The "Kilburn Battalion" of the IRA claimed responsibility for the explosion, but The Angry Brigade also claimed to have carried out the attack. It was likely the work of the Angry Brigade and not the IRA.
- 22 February 1972: Aldershot bombing: The Official Irish Republican Army ('Official' IRA) detonated a car bomb at Aldershot British Army base, Hampshire. The blast killed seven civilian staff.
- 19 September 1972: The Palestinian terrorist group Black September posted a letter bomb to the Israeli embassy in London killing an Israeli diplomat.
- 8 March 1973: The Provisional Irish Republican Army ('Provisional' IRA) planted four car bombs in London. Two of the bombs exploded outside the Old Bailey and the Ministry of Agriculture, injuring dozens. The bombs outside New Scotland Yard and an army recruitment office near Whitehall were defused.
- 10 September 1973: The Provisional IRA set off bombs at London's King's Cross and Euston stations, injuring 21 people.
- 18 December 1973: 1973 Westminster bombing: An IRA car bomb exploded outside the Home Office building in Millbank, London, injuring 60 people.
- 4 February 1974: M62 coach bombing: An IRA bomb exploded aboard a bus carrying British soldiers and several of their family members in Yorkshire, killing nine soldiers and three civilians.
- 26 March 1974: Claro Barracks at Ripon, North Yorkshire; Two stores and the main NAAFI building were damaged by three IRA bombs planted by Peter McMullen. Another device was then destroyed in a controlled explosion by army bomb disposal experts in the main barracks, where 100 soldiers had been sleeping. The 49-year-old manageress of the NAAFI shop suffered facial cuts from flying glass during the attack.
- 11 June 1974: Queen Elizabeth Barracks, Strensall near York, North Yorkshire; A bomb (thrown over the perimeter fence?) destroyed most of the Green Howards Band's musical instruments.
- 17 June 1974: Houses of Parliament bombing: An IRA bomb exploded at the Houses of Parliament, causing extensive damage and injuring 11 people.
- 17 July 1974: Tower of London bombing: A bomb exploded in the Tower of London, killing one and injuring 41.
- 5 October 1974: Guildford pub bombings: IRA bombs exploded in two pubs frequented by off-duty British military personnel in Guildford, Surrey. Four soldiers and a civilian were killed, and 44 were injured.
- 22 October 1974: An IRA bomb exploded in Brooks's gentleman's club in London, injuring three people.
- 7 November 1974: An IRA bomb exploded in a pub frequented by British military personnel in Woolwich, London, killing a soldier and a civilian.
- 14 November 1974: James Patrick McDade, a Lieutenant in the Birmingham Battalion of the Provisional Irish Republican Army (IRA), was killed in a premature explosion whilst planting a bomb at the Coventry telephone exchange in 1974.
- 21 November 1974: Birmingham pub bombings: IRA bombs exploded in two pubs in Birmingham, killing 21 people and injuring 182.
- 18 December 1974: 1974 Bristol bombing: Two IRA bombs exploded in one of Bristol's shopping districts in the run-up to Christmas, injuring 17.
- 27 January 1975: An IRA bomb exploded at Lewis's department store in Manchester, England. Following a warning telephoned to the Press Association at 16:07, the bomb exploded 17 minutes later injuring 19 people, one of them seriously. Seven bombs were also planted in London; five of them exploded, injuring six people.
- 27 August 1975: Caterham Arms pub bombing: An IRA bomb exploded in a pub frequented by British military personnel in Caterham, Surrey, injuring 33.
- 5 September 1975: An IRA bomb exploded in the lobby of the Hilton Hotel, London, killing two people and injuring 63.
- 9 October 1975: Green Park tube station bombing: An IRA bomb exploded by Green Park tube station in London, killing one.
- 18 November 1975: IRA members threw a bomb into Walton's restaurant in London, killing two people and injuring 23.
- 27 November 1975: IRA gunmen assassinated political activist and television personality Ross McWhirter in Enfield Town, London.
- 6–12 December 1975: Balcombe Street siege: Four IRA members, who were fleeing from the police, barricaded themselves inside a flat in London and held the two occupants hostage. The siege lasted for six days and ended when the IRA members surrendered and released the hostages.
- 20 December 1975: Biddy Mulligan's pub bombing: The Ulster Defence Association (UDA) bombed Biddy Mulligan's pub in the Kilburn area of London. Five people were injured. It said it bombed the pub because it was frequented by Irish republican sympathizers.
- 4 March 1976: Cannon Street train bombing: An IRA bomb exploded in an empty train at Cannon Street station in London, injuring eight.
- 15 March 1976: West Ham station attack: An IRA bomb exploded on a train at West Ham station in London, injuring seven. The bomber then shot two people while fleeing, killing one.
- 27 March 1976: Olympia bombing: An IRA bomb exploded at the Olympia, London, killing one and injuring more than 80 people.
- 31 December 1977: An explosive device detonated inside the passenger compartment of a car owned by the Embassy of the Syrian Arab Republic, killing two members of the Syrian embassy staff.
- 17 December 1978: Co-ordinated IRA bombs exploded in Manchester, Liverpool, Coventry, Bristol, and Southampton, injuring at least seven in Bristol.
- 17 January 1979: A bomb exploded at a Texaco oil terminal on Canvey Island, Essex, tearing a hole in a tank that was initially thought to contain aviation fuel.
- 17 February 1979: Glasgow pub bombings: The Ulster Volunteer Force (UVF) bombed two pubs frequented by Catholics in Glasgow, Scotland. Both pubs were wrecked, and several people were wounded. It said it bombed the pubs because they were used for Irish republican fundraising.
- 30 March 1979: Airey Neave killed when a bomb exploded under his car as he drove out of the Palace of Westminster car park. The Irish National Liberation Army (INLA) claimed responsibility.

=== 1980s ===
- 30 April 1980: Iranian Embassy siege: Six Iranian Arab gunmen stormed the Iranian Embassy in London and took hostages. The siege lasted for six days, until the hostages were rescued in a raid by the SAS, which was broadcast live on TV. Two of the hostages were killed, while the hostage-takers were all either killed or captured.
- January 1981: Bomb inside the RAF band barracks in RAF Uxbridge. A security patrol discovered the bomb surrounded by drums of petrol. The barracks were evacuated, but the device exploded before the bomb disposal arrived. The blast was heard up to 2 miles away. There were two minor injuries.
- 10 October 1981: The IRA detonated a bomb outside Chelsea Barracks, London, killing two and injuring 39.
- 26 October 1981: The IRA bombed a Wimpy Bar on Oxford Street, killing Kenneth Howorth, the Metropolitan Police explosives officer attempting to defuse it.
- 14 March 1982: The bombing of the London offices of the African National Congress (ANC), which opposed the apartheid government of South Africa, wounding one person who was living upstairs. General Johann Coetzee, former head of the South African Security Police, and seven other policemen accepted responsibility for the attack after the end of the apartheid government.
- 20 July 1982: Hyde Park and Regent's Park bombings: IRA bombs exploded during British military ceremonies in Hyde Park and Regent's Park, London, killing eleven soldiers of the Household Cavalry and the Royal Green Jackets.
- 17 December 1983: Harrods bombing: An IRA car bomb exploded outside Harrods department store in London, following a telephoned warning. Five people were killed, including three police officers, and the sixth victim – another police officer – died in hospital from his injuries a week later. 90 other people were injured but survived.
- 12 October 1984: Brighton hotel bombing: In an attempt to assassinate Prime Minister Margaret Thatcher, the IRA detonated a bomb in the Grand Brighton Hotel during the Conservative Party conference. It killed five Conservative Party members, including MP Anthony Berry.
- 21 December 1988: Pan Am Flight 103 was blown up by a bomb in a suitcase while in flight over Lockerbie, Scotland, after taking off from Heathrow. All 259 of the plane's passengers and crew were killed, along with 11 Lockerbie residents, claiming a total of 270 lives.
- 3 August 1989: A man using the alias Mustafa Mahmoud Mazeh accidentally blew himself up along with two floors of a central London hotel while preparing a bomb intended to kill author Salman Rushdie.
- 22 September 1989: Deal barracks bombing: Eleven Royal Marines bandsmen were killed and 22 injured when an IRA bomb exploded at the Royal Marines base in Deal, Kent.

=== 1990s ===
- 14 May 1990: The IRA bombed an army education centre in Eltham, London, injuring seven.
- 16 May 1990: The IRA bombed a minibus at an army recruitment centre in Wembley, London, killing one soldier and injuring four.
- 1 June 1990: A British soldier was killed, and two were wounded in an IRA gun attack at Lichfield City railway station, Staffordshire.
- 9 June 1990: Honourable Artillery Company bombing: The IRA detonated a bomb at the Honourable Artillery Company's barracks in London, injuring 19.
- 26 June 1990: Carlton Club bombing: The IRA bombed a London club for Conservative politicians, fatally wounding one and injuring 20.
- 20 July 1990: London Stock Exchange bombing: The IRA detonated a bomb at the London Stock Exchange causing damage to the building but no injuries.
- 30 July 1990: Ian Gow, Conservative MP, was assassinated by the IRA when a booby trap bomb exploded under his car outside his home in East Sussex.
- 4 January 1991: An IRA bomb exploded, and a shot was fired at the entrance to Territorial Army Firing Range, Cannock Chase, Staffordshire. No injuries.
- 7 February 1991: The IRA carried out a mortar attack of 10 Downing Street, in an attempt to assassinate Prime Minister John Major and his cabinet. One of the shells exploded in the back garden of 10 Downing Street, but there were no deaths.
- 18 February 1991: An IRA bomb exploded at Victoria Station. One man was killed, and 38 people were injured.
- 15 November 1991: An IRA bomb exploded in St Albans city centre. Two fatalities, both members of the Provisional IRA (Patricia Black and Frankie Ryan), were the only casualties.
- 28 February 1992: An IRA bomb exploded at London Bridge station, injuring 29 people.
- 10 April 1992: Baltic Exchange bombing: A large IRA truck bomb exploded outside the Baltic Exchange building in the City of London, following a telephoned warning. It killed three people and caused £800 million worth of damage – more than the total damage caused by the 10,000 explosions that had occurred during the Troubles in Northern Ireland up to that point. A few hours later a bomb exploded in Staples Corner.
- 13 April 1992: the INLA shot a British soldier (Michael Newman) outside the recruiting office where he worked in Derby. He died of his wounds the following day.
- 25 August 1992: The IRA planted three firebombs in Shrewsbury, Shropshire. Bombs were placed in Shoplatch, The Charles Darwin Centre, and Shrewsbury Castle, the latter causing the most damage as the castle housed the Shropshire Regimental Museum and many priceless historical artifacts were lost and damaged by fire and smoke. No fatalities or injuries were recorded.
- 12 October 1992: Sussex Arms bombing: A bomb exploded in the gents' toilet of a pub in Covent Garden, killing one person and injuring four others.
- 16 November 1992: IRA planted a bomb at the Canary Wharf, but was spotted by security guards. The bomb failed to detonate.
- 3 December 1992: The IRA detonated two car bombs in central Manchester, injuring 65 people.
- 10 December 1992: Wood Green Shopping City bombing. Two IRA bomb attacks injure 11 people.
- 28 January 1993: 1993 Harrods bombing: Far-left Red Action members, together with the IRA, bombed Harrods in London, injuring four.
- 26 February 1993: Warrington bomb attacks (Part 1): IRA bombs attached to gas storage facilities exploded, causing widespread damage and a dramatic fireball. PC Mark Toker was shot three times by the bombers after pulling over their van hours before.
- 27 February 1993: Camden Town bombing: An IRA bomb exploded on Camden High Street in London, injuring 18.
- 20 March 1993: Warrington bomb attacks (Part 2): Two bombs exploded in litter bins in a shopping precinct in Warrington, Cheshire, killing a three-year-old boy and injuring 55 people. The second bomb occurred within a minute of the first, directly in the path of many of those fleeing from the initial blast. A 12-year-old boy became the second fatality when he died in hospital from his injuries several days later. A warning had been telephoned to the Samaritans in Liverpool 30 minutes before the detonation, but it hadn't specified Warrington.
- 24 April 1993: Bishopsgate bombing: The IRA detonated a huge (equivalent to 1.2 tonnes of TNT) truck bomb in the City of London at Bishopsgate. Police had received a telephoned warning but were still evacuating the area at the time of the explosion. A newspaper photographer was killed, more than 40 people were injured, and £350 million worth of damage was caused.
- March 1994: Heathrow mortar attacks: The IRA launched a series of mortar attacks on Heathrow Airport near London. The attacks caused severe disruption but little damage.
- 26–27 July 1994: A group of Palestinians detonated two car bombs in London, one outside the Israeli embassy and one outside Balfour House, home to a Jewish charity. The attacks injured twenty people.
- 13 August 1994: 2.5 lbs of Semtex packed into a bicycle left outside Woolworths in Bognor Regis, exploded, damaging 15 shops. A similar bomb found in nearby Brighton.
- 9 February 1996: London Docklands bombing: The IRA detonated a powerful truck bomb in the Canary Wharf financial district of London, following telephoned warnings. The blast caused severe damage and killed two people.
- 18 February 1996: Aldwych bus bombing: An improvised high explosive device detonated prematurely on a bus travelling along Aldwych in central London, killing Edward O'Brien, the IRA member transporting the device, and injuring eight others.
- 15 June 1996: Manchester bombing: The IRA detonated a powerful truck bomb in central Manchester, following a telephoned warning. It was the biggest bomb detonated in Britain since the Second World War. It caused widespread damage and injured more than 200 people, but there were no deaths.
- 17, 24 and 30 April 1999: 1999 London nail bombings: David Copeland set off three nail bombs in London targeting the black, Bangladeshi and gay communities respectively, killing three people (including a pregnant woman) and injuring 129. Copeland was convicted of murder on 30 June 2000.

Refer also to the list of IRA terrorist incidents presented to Parliament between 1980 and 1994, listed halfway down the page here

=== 2000s ===
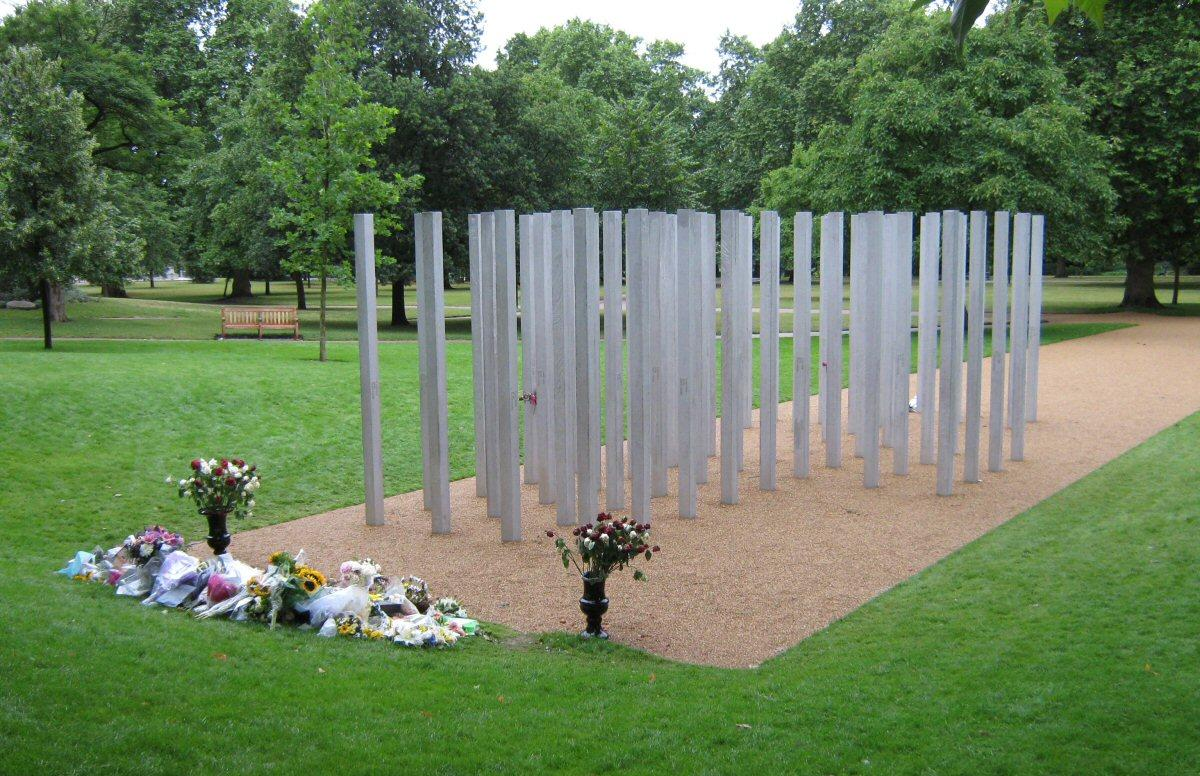
Memorial in London's Hyde Park to the victims of the 7 July bombings.

- 20 September 2000: The Real IRA fired an RPG-22 rocket launcher at the MI6 headquarters in London.
- 4 March 2001: The Real IRA detonated a car bomb outside the BBC Television Centre in London, damaging the front of the building and injuring one person.
- 3 August 2001: The Real IRA detonated a car bomb in Ealing, London, damaging buildings and injuring seven people.
- 7 July 2005: 7/7 central London bombings conducted by four separate Islamist extremist suicide bombers (three of whom were British-born sons of Pakistani immigrants), which targeted civilians using the public transport system during the morning rush hour. Three bombs were detonated on three separate trains on the London Underground and one on a double-decker bus. As well as the suicide bombers, 52 other people were killed, and around 700 more were injured. It was the UK's worst terrorist incident since the 1988 Lockerbie bombing and the first Islamist suicide attack in the country.
- 21 July 2005: 21/7 attempted London bombings, a copycat follow-up of the 7/7 bombings by four Islamist extremists on London's public transport system. Only the detonators exploded, failing to trigger the much larger backpack bombs, resulting in only one injury (an asthma attack).
- January–February 2007: Miles Cooper letter bomb campaign. Miles Cooper said he was motivated by anti-authoritarianism and opposition to surveillance.
- 30 June 2007: Two Islamist terrorists drove a Jeep Cherokee loaded with propane canisters into the glass doors of the Glasgow Airport terminal, setting it ablaze. Five people were injured, and the only death was of one of the perpetrators, who later died in hospital from his injuries. It was the first terrorist attack to take place in Scotland since the Lockerbie bombing in 1988.

=== 2010s ===
- 14 May 2010: MP Stephen Timms was stabbed during his constituency surgery by Roshonara Choudhry, a British Islamic extremist, in an attempt to kill him. She was found guilty of attempted murder and jailed for life with a minimum term of 15 years. Choudhry was the first Al-Qaeda sympathiser to attempt an assassination in Britain.
- 29 April – 12 July 2013: Pavlo Lapshyn, a Ukrainian student and right-wing extremist, fatally stabbed Birmingham resident Mohammed Saleem on 29 April. Lapshyn later detonated a home-made bomb outside a mosque in Walsall on 21 June. On 28 June, Lapshyn detonated a second home-made bomb near a mosque in Wolverhampton, and attacked a mosque in Tipton with an improvised explosive device containing nails on 12 July. He later admitted to police that he wished to start a "race war" and was sentenced to serve at least 40 years.
- 22 May 2013: A British soldier, Lee Rigby, was murdered in an attack in Woolwich by Michael Adebolajo and Michael Adebowale, two Islamist extremists armed with a handgun, knives, and a cleaver. An attempt was made to decapitate Rigby, which was, in part, foiled by bystanders distracting the attackers. Both men were sentenced to life imprisonment, with Adebolajo given a whole life order and Adebowale ordered to serve at least 45 years. Adebolajo had been the subject of interest by the intelligence agencies who conceded there were at least 5 occasions when his actions should have triggered his arrest.
- 10–14 February 2014: The New Irish Republican Army (NIRA) claims responsibility for a series of parcel bombs sent to army recruitment offices in Oxford, Brighton, Canterbury, Slough, Aldershot, Reading and Chatham.
- 18 February 2016: Jalal Uddin, a Muslim imam in Rochdale, was bludgeoned to death by supporters of the Islamic State terrorist group for practising certain forms of Islamic healing which IS considered "black magic". A public inquiry led by Thomas Teague KC concluded that the attack could have been prevented if not for "serious mistakes" and "missed opportunities" on the part of Greater Manchester Police, who had identified the plot's ringleader Mohammed Kadir as a person of interest but did not take any action to investigate or detain him.
- 16 June 2016: Murder of Jo Cox – Thomas Mair, a 52-year-old white nationalist, shot and stabbed the MP Jo Cox outside a surgery in Birstall, West Yorkshire, and severely wounded a passerby who came to her aid. The attack was treated as an act of terrorism, and in sentencing Mair to life imprisonment the judge said "There is no doubt that this murder was done for the purpose of advancing a political, racial and ideological cause namely that of violent white supremacism and exclusive nationalism most associated with Nazism and its modern forms".
- 22 March 2017: 2017 Westminster attack – Khalid Masood, a 52-year-old Islamist, drove a car into pedestrians on Westminster Bridge, killing three and injuring almost fifty, one of whom died two weeks later. He ran into the grounds of the Palace of Westminster and fatally stabbed police officer Keith Palmer, before being shot dead by police. The attack was treated as an act of terrorism motivated by Islamic extremism.
- 22 May 2017: Manchester Arena bombing – An Islamist suicide bomber, 22-year-old Salman Abedi, blew himself up at Manchester Arena as people were leaving an Ariana Grande concert, killing 22 and injuring 1,017. It became the deadliest terrorist attack in Britain since the 7/7 London bombings in 2005. Many of the victims were children or teenagers, the youngest being an eight-year-old girl.
- 3 June 2017: 2017 London Bridge attack – Three Islamists drove a van into pedestrians on London Bridge before stabbing people in and around pubs in nearby Borough Market. Eight people were killed, and at least 48 were wounded. The attackers were shot dead by police eight minutes after the incident was reported. All three were wearing fake suicide bomb vests.
- 19 June 2017: Finsbury Park attack – Darren Osborne, a 47-year-old British man, drove a van into Muslim worshippers near Finsbury Park Mosque, London, killing 1 and injuring 11. The incident was investigated by counter-terrorism police as a terrorist attack. On 23 June, Osborne was charged with terrorism-related murder and attempted murder. In February 2018 at Woolwich Crown Court, he was found guilty on both counts and was sentenced to life imprisonment with a minimum term of 43 years.
- 15 September 2017: Parsons Green bombing – The London tube train was targeted, and witnesses reported a flash and bang. Thirty people were injured, mostly with flash burns and crush injuries, but there were no fatalities. The threat level was raised to its highest point of critical soon after. Ahmed Hassan, who committed the bombing, received a life sentence with a minimum term of 34 years.
- 14 August 2018: 2018 Westminster car attack – A Ford Fiesta ran down pedestrians outside the Palace of Westminster. The car then went on to crash into the security barrier, after aiming at two police officers. Salih Khater, who carried out the attack, received a life sentence with a minimum term of 15 years.
- 31 December 2018: Mahdi Mohamud, a Dutch national from a Somali family, stabbed three in a knife attack at Manchester Victoria station. Mohamud shouted "Allahu Akbar!" and "Long live the Caliphate!" during the attack. Despite suffering from paranoid schizophrenia, Mahomud was convicted of a terror offence and attempted murder of three people due to his possession of significant amounts of extremist material and the attack's extensive planning.
- 16 March 2019: Vincent Fuller, a 50-year-old British man, wrote Facebook posts saying "Kill all the non-English" and agreeing with the killer in the Christchurch mosque shootings. He then used a baseball bat to attack the home of a neighbour of Indian descent and several cars driven by non-white drivers, shouting "Kill Muslims" and "white supremacy," according to witnesses, before stabbing a 19-year-old Bulgarian man. A judge found the attack had a "terrorist connection." Fuller was sentenced to prison for 18 years and nine months.
- 29 November 2019: 2019 London Bridge stabbing – On 29 November 2019, police were called to a stabbing near London Bridge, in Central London, England, at 1:58 pm. A statement said that one man was detained, and "several people" were injured. Two people were killed in the attack, and three were left injured. The attacker, 28-year-old Usman Khan, was shot dead by police and confirmed dead on the scene.

=== 2020s ===
- 9 January 2020: Two inmates at Whitemoor prison in Cambridgeshire, wearing realistic fake suicide vests and carrying improvised bladed weapons, stabbed one prison officer several times, causing serious injuries and harming several others. One of the inmates, Muslim convert Ziamani, from Camberwell, southeast London, had been jailed for 22 years for hatching a plot to behead a UK soldier inspired by the murder of Fusilier Lee Rigby.
- 2 February 2020: 2020 Streatham stabbing – Sudesh Amman, wearing a fake suicide vest similar to the one used in the 2019 London Bridge stabbing, was shot dead by armed police after stabbing and injuring two people in Streatham, London Borough of Lambeth. One of the victims sustained life-threatening injuries.
- 20 June 2020: 2020 Reading stabbings – On 20 June 2020, Khairi Saadallah, shouting "Allahu Akbar", attacked two groups of people socialising in Forbury Gardens, a public park in the centre of Reading, killing three and injuring three others. On 11 January 2021, he was sentenced to life imprisonment without the possibility of parole. The sentencing judge, Mr Justice Sweeney said that it was a terrorist attack and that the purpose was to advance an extremist Islamic cause.
- 15 October 2021: Murder of David Amess – Ali Harbi Ali stabbed MP Sir David Amess at his constituency surgery and was sentenced to life imprisonment with a whole life order.
- 14 November 2021: Liverpool Women's Hospital bombing – Emad Al-Swealmeen, carrying a homemade bomb, arrived at the Liverpool Women's Hospital by taxi. The bomb exploded, killing him and injuring the driver. The incident was quickly described as terrorism.
- 30 October 2022: Dover firebomb attack - Andrew Leak threw three petrol bombs attached to fireworks at the perimeter fence of the Western Jet Foil migrant processing centre in Dover, Kent, before killing himself at a nearby petrol station. Two people sustained minor injuries.
- 15 October 2023: Ahmed Ali Alid stabbed 70-year-old Terence Carney to death in Hartlepool and seriously injured another man, who survived. Alid claimed the attack to be an act of protest against the Gaza war. Alid was sentenced to life imprisonment with a minimum term of 44 years in May 2024.
- 2 April 2024: Callum Parslow, a 33-year-old white nationalist, stabbed an asylum seeker at a hotel in Hindlip. The attack was motivated by Parslow's extreme racial views and anger over the small boats crisis. He was sentenced to life imprisonment.
- On 29 July 2024, a mass stabbing targeting young girls occurred at the Hart Space, Southport, Merseyside, United Kingdom. Seventeen-year-old Axel Rudakubana killed three children and injured ten others. Rudakubana He was charged with three counts of murder, ten counts of attempted murder, and possession of a bladed article. He was later separately charged under the Biological Weapons Act 1974 and Terrorism Act 2000 in relation to the possession of ricin and a military study of an Al-Qaeda training manual.
- 2 August 2025: Alina Burns, an 18-year-old white nationalist, attempted to behead a Kurdish barber, Mohammed Mahmoodi, in Bristol. She was later sentenced to 19 years and six months in prison on the 15 May 2026.
- 2 October 2025: Manchester synagogue attack – Jihad al-Shamie attacked worshippers outside a synagogue in Manchester. Two people were killed before al-Shamie was fatally shot by police. Investigators suspected the attack to be motivated by religious extremism.

== Aborted, failed, or prevented attacks ==
These are known attacks, some of which caused damage, which could have constituted a threat to life had they worked or been large enough. The list includes only a few attacks that were at the planning stage but not implemented. Also, authorities do not make public information about many thwarted attacks.

- 5 November 1605: Gunpowder Plot: A pro-Catholic conspiracy attempted to assassinate King James VI and I during the State Opening of Parliament, where the polity of England had assembled, including the lords spiritual and temporal and members of parliament. 36 barrels of gunpowder were found under the Palace of Westminster being guarded by Guy Fawkes. The attempt was foiled, and Fawkes and the leaders of the conspiracy were convicted of high treason and sentenced to be hanged, drawn and quartered.
- 15 February 1894: Anarchist Martial Bourdin was killed by his own bomb outside the Royal Observatory in Greenwich Park. There were no other casualties. Joseph Conrad's novel The Secret Agent, published in 1907, drew on this event.
- January 1981: The Provisional Irish Republican Army (IRA) planted a bomb in the Suvla barrack block at RAF Uxbridge. The device was discovered, and the 35 RAF musicians and 15 airmen living there were evacuated before it exploded.
- 1985: Police found 10 grenades, seven petrol bombs and two detonators at the home of former Group Development Director for the British National Party, Tony Lecomber, after he was injured by a nail bomb that he was carrying to the offices of the Workers' Revolutionary Party. Convicted under the Explosive Substances Act 1883.
- 1986: Hindawi affair: Jordanian militant Nezar al-Hindawi deceived his fiancee Anne-Marie Murphy into carrying 1.5 kilograms of Semtex aboard an El Al flight from London to Tel Aviv. Hindawi had plotted to detonate the explosive while the plane was in the air. The plot led to the British government cutting off diplomatic relations with Syria due to suspicion of their ambassador's involvement with Hindawi.
- 1 March 1992: An IRA bomb was defused by police at White Hart Lane train station in London.
- 23 October 1993: In Reading, Berkshire, an IRA bomb exploded at a signal post near the railway station, some hours after 5 lb (2 kg) of Semtex was found in the toilets of the station. The resulting closure of the railway line and evacuation of the station caused travel chaos for several hours, but no one was injured.
- 24 April 1996: 1996 Hammersmith Bridge bombing attempt.
- 1 June 2000: Real IRA suspected of planting a high-explosive device attached to a girder under the south side of Hammersmith Bridge, which detonated at 4:30 am.
- 17 November 2000: Police arrested Moinul Abedin. His Birmingham house contained bomb-making instructions, equipment, and traces of the explosive HTMD. A nearby lock-up rented by Abedin contained 100 kg of the chemical components of HTMD. In March 2020, Jonathan Evans, former Director General of MI5 gave an interview and commented on the case: 'The first indication that we had an actual, live, real threat in the U.K....the first arrest of anybody in the U.K. linked to al-Qaeda who was planning an attack here...with the fall of the Taliban and the Afghan camps in 2001/2002, evidence came to light which demonstrated that this was an at least inspired al-Qaeda plot of some sort'.
- 3 November 2001: The 2001 Birmingham bombing by the Real Irish Republican Army. The bomb failed to explode.
- 21 July 2005: The 21 July 2005 London bombings, also conducted by four would-be Islamic suicide bombers on public transport, whose bombs failed to detonate.
- 10 August 2006: The 2006 transatlantic aircraft plot to blow up 10 planes flying from Heathrow saw the arrest of 24 people from their homes in Britain, chaos at airports as security measures were put in place, and numerous high-level statements from US and UK officials. Eight people were put on trial, and three were found guilty of conspiracy to murder. It was shown at their trial how bottles of liquid could be made into effective bombs. Following this incident, carriage of liquids in hand luggage on aircraft was restricted internationally to very small amounts. Rashid Rauf, suspected to have been the link between the UK plotters and Pakistan, escaped to Pakistan, where he was arrested, but escaped again on his way to an extradition hearing. It was reported that he was killed in a US airstrike in North Waziristan in November 2008.
- 28 September 2006: Talbot Street bomb-making haul.
- 1 February 2007: Plot to behead a British Muslim soldier to undermine the morale of the British Army. Pervaiz Khan, Basiru Gassama, Zahoor Iqbal, Mohammed Irfan, and Hamid Elasmar were sentenced to between 40 months and life for the plot.
- 29 June 2007: London car bombs. Bilal Abdullah and Kafeel Ahmed were found to be involved in planting the bombs. Both were also responsible for the Glasgow Airport Attack.
- 22 May 2008: Exeter attempted bombing in a café toilet by an Islamist extremist, injuring only the perpetrator.
- 3 September 2009: Manchester Piccadilly multiple suicide bomber plot. In 2009 Pakistani national Abid Naseer was one of 12 suspects arrested on suspicion of being part of a Manchester terror cell, after arriving in the UK a year before. All were released on insufficient evidence, but ordered to be deported from the UK. Naseer's deportation to Pakistan was prevented on human rights grounds, as he was ruled 'likely to be mistreated'. In 2013, on further evidence from Al-Qaeda sources, including documents from the bin Laden Raid, he was extradited to the US, and on 4 March 2015 was found guilty of masterminding an Al-Qaeda directed plot to synchronize multiple suicide bombings around Manchester's Arndale Centre and Piccadilly shopping centre in a coordinated attack involving other locations, including the New York Subway, with other cells.
- June 2012: Five Islamic extremists plotted to bomb an English Defence League rally in Dewsbury but arrived late and were arrested when returning to Birmingham. A sixth was also convicted.
- April 2013: As part of Operation Pitsford, 11 Muslim extremists are jailed for plotting a terror attack involving suicide bombers.
- 7 July 2015: Attempted anniversary London 7/7 bomb plot. Mohammed Rehman and Sana Ahmed Khan were sentenced to life imprisonment for preparing an act of terrorism. They had 10 kg of urea nitrate. Rehman called himself the 'silent bomber' and asked his Twitter followers to choose between the Westfield London shopping centre or the London Underground for the planned suicide bomb.
- 25 August 2017: Mohiussunnath Chowdhury slashed police officers with a sword outside Buckingham Palace while shouting "Allahu akbar" repeatedly. He was found not guilty of terrorism by a court, but was convicted on a single count of preparing for an act of terrorism. During and after his release from prison, he went on to plan further terror attacks and was arrested again in 2018.
- 28 November 2017: In an attempt to kill Prime Minister Theresa May, Islamic State terrorist Naa'imur Zakariyah Rahman was arrested in London after collecting a fake bomb and suicide vest from undercover operatives.
- February 2018: Ethan Stables, a white supremacist, was arrested plotting a machete attack on an LGBT parade.
- 9 April 2018: Fatah Mohammed Abdullah "bought more than 8,000 matches, fireworks, fuses, explosives precursors – or substances that could be used to manufacture explosives – and a remote control detonator." He pleaded guilty to inciting people to commit terror attacks in Germany and buying explosive equipment.
- 3 July 2019: Mohiussunnath Chowdhury and his sister were arrested for planning to target London tourist sites, including Madame Tussauds, Piccadilly Circus, and London's Gay Pride parade, using a vehicle, knife, and gun. He was convicted of plotting terror acts on 10 February 2020.
- 21 February 2020: Islamic State supporter Safiyya Amira Shaikh was arrested after she admitted plotting to blow herself up in a bomb attack on St Paul's Cathedral, stating that she would "kill 'til I'm dead"
- 29 December 2020: Police arrested Matthew Cronjager, the self-proclaimed "boss" of the terror group Exiled 393. Cronjager and others had discussed plans for a fascist revolution in the UK, including arming the group through a collective PayPal account that could be used to buy weapons. Cronjager also plotted to kill an Asian friend who had boasted to him about sleeping with white women, telling an undercover police officer that he wanted to obtain a sawn-off shotgun to kill the victim for "a violation of nature". He was sentenced to eleven years in prison.
- 5 March 2022: Al-Arfat Hassan plotted to "kill thousands" in an attack on an unspecified target in London. He purchased knives and attempted to construct a bomb. Several other people were arrested for failing to report the plot to the police.
- 23 September 2022: Edward Little was arrested while travelling from Brighton to London, intending to assassinate Christian preacher Hatun Tash, and allegedly planned to kill others, in Hyde Park. He pleaded guilty on 19 May 2023 to preparing to commit acts of terrorism.
- 20 January 2023: Attempted bombing of St James's Hospital in Leeds: Mohammad Sohail Farooq, a student nurse, was arrested by armed police after plotting to launch an Islamic State-inspired suicide attack on a hospital in Leeds and an RAF base using 10 kg of explosives. He was found guilty of preparing acts of terrorism on 2 July 2024.
- 18 March 2024: Jacob Graham, an anarchist, planned to launch a bombing campaign aimed at politicians and government buildings, aiming to kill at least 50 people. He had acquired explosive chemicals and had been attempting to construct bombs at the time of arrest. He was motivated by hatred of the government and ecological beliefs. Graham was convicted of preparing terrorist acts along with possession and dissemination of terrorist materials.
- 17 October 2025: Three followers of Nazi ideology, Brogan Stewart, Christopher Ringrose, and Marco Pitzettu, were imprisoned after being found to have planned attacks on mosques and synagogues to initiate a 'race war'. They had amassed over 200 weapons and had 3D printed most of the components of a semi-automatic firearm, styling themselves an armed military group, Einsatz-14, named with reference to the Einsatzgruppen and the white supremacist Fourteen Words. The trio planned first to attack an Islamic education centre in Leeds, including plans to torture a local Muslim leader, and were arrested after security services judged an attack was "imminent".
- 23 December 2025: Two Islamic State sympathisers were found guilty of plotting a mass shooting against Jewish communities in Manchester, reportedly inspired by the November 2015 Paris attacks. The men told an undercover police officer they intended to attack a march against anti-Semitism before targeting other Jewish people in the northern part of the city. Greater Manchester Police said that the attack, had it succeeded, could have been the deadliest in British history.

Given the nature of counterterrorism, successes in preventing terrorist attacks in the UK are not always disclosed. Authorities sometimes simply state numbers of attacks prevented, e.g., 12 attacks were reported in March 2017 to have been thwarted in the previous year, some only hours before they were to have been attempted. During the police advocacy of 90-day detention in relation to the Terrorism Act 2006 they produced documents listing cases about which they could not go into detail.

== Arrests, detentions, and other incidents related to Terrorism Acts ==
These are cases where the Terrorism Acts were invoked, or which were stated to be terrorist in nature. This list includes both plots foiled at an early stage before any materials were actually assembled, and totally innocent suspects.

- 11 April 1997: Eight members of the Provisional IRA – including an Irish-American that served as a US Marine – were on trial after a July 1996 plot to blow up six electrical stations knocking out electricity in the London and South East England region, foiled by police and MI5.
- 5 January 2003: Wood Green ricin plot, where police arrested six Algerian men accused of manufacturing ricin to use for a poison attack on the London Underground. No poison was found, and all men were acquitted of all terror charges, except for Kamel Bourgass, who stabbed four police officers, killing one, during his arrest in Manchester several days later. He was convicted of the murder of the officer he killed. He was also convicted of plotting to poison members of the public with ricin and other poisons. Two of the suspects in the plot were subsequently convicted of possessing false passports.
- October 2003: Andrew Rowe arrested in Dover after being detained as he entered the Channel Tunnel in France. Convicted as a "global terrorist" and sentenced to 15 years in prison on 23 September 2005 based on traces of explosives on a pair of socks and a code translation book.
- 24 September 2004: Four men arrested in the Holiday Inn in Brent Cross, trying to buy red mercury, a mythical substance which they thought existed and could be used to construct a nuclear bomb, from a newspaper reporter. One man was released three days later, while the other three were cleared at their trial on 25 July 2006, during which the jury was told that "whether red mercury does or does not exist is irrelevant".
- 28 July 2005: David Mery was arrested at Southwark tube station on suspicion of terrorism, shortly after the Tube attacks of 7 and 21 July, for wearing a jacket "too warm for the season" and carrying a bulky rucksack. All charges were dropped on 31 August. It took four more years for the police to apologise for the "unlawful arrest, detention and search of [his] home".
- 1 November 2007: Police searching for indecent images of children found explosives in the home of British People's Party local organiser Martyn Gilleard in Goole, East Riding of Yorkshire, and arrested him under the Terrorism Act. He was subsequently charged with possession of material for terrorist purposes and collection of information useful to a terrorist, and also pleaded guilty to possessing 39,000 indecent images. He was jailed for 16 years.
- 14 May 2008: The Nottingham Two were arrested and detained for six days under the Terrorism Act 2000. A postgraduate student had downloaded a 140-page English translation of an Al-Qaeda document from the United States Department of Justice website for his PhD research on militant Islam. He sent it to a friend in the Modern Language department for printing. Both were cleared of [-related offences, but the friend was immediately re-arrested on immigration grounds.
- 14 September 2008: Oxford graduate Stephen Clarke arrested after someone thought they saw him taking a photograph of a sealed manhole cover outside the Manchester Central Library. He was arrested under section 41 of the Terrorism Act 2000, held for 36 hours while his house and computer were searched, and then released without charge. No photographs of manhole covers were found.
- 13 February 2009: Nine men arrested on the M65 motorway under section 40 of the Terrorism Act 2000. Six were kept handcuffed in the back of a van for seven hours. The remaining three were detained for six days. No one was charged.
- 19 September 2011: West Midlands Police arrested a woman who lived in the Alum Rock area of Birmingham. Salma Kabal, 22, appeared in court on 16 November 2011, accused of failing to inform police that her husband, Ashik Ali, planned to kill himself. The official charge was that she "knew or believed might be of material assistance in securing the apprehension, prosecution or conviction of another person for an offence involving the commission, preparation or instigation of an act of terrorism".
- 15 November 2011: West Midlands Counter Terrorism Unit arrested four people at their homes who were from Sparkhill, Birmingham, on suspicion of conducting terrorist offences. The four men appeared in court in Westminster Magistrates Court on 19 November 2011, charged with terrorism offences. They were named as Khobaib Hussain, Ishaaq Hussain, and Shahid Kasam Khan, all 19, and Naweed Mahmood Ali, 24. They were charged with fundraising for terrorist purposes and with travelling to Pakistan for terrorist training. They were sentenced to life imprisonment at the Old Bailey, but in 2024 applied to the Criminal Cases Review Commission (CCRC) hoping that it would investigate their convictions.
- 28 June 2012: Two men, aged 18 and 32, were arrested at separate residential addresses in east London by officers from the Metropolitan Police Counter-Terrorism Command, at 7 am on suspicion of involvement in a bomb plot concerning the 2012 London Summer Olympics.
- 20 August 2014: Four men were arrested in Northern Ireland over a New IRA plot to send letter bombs to targets in England, including home secretary Theresa May.
- 9 June 2016: John Letts and Sally Lane, the parents of Jack Letts, were arrested on suspicion of financing terrorism for allegedly providing Jack with money. They appeared in court on June 14 and were granted bail. Both received a 15-month suspended sentence in 2019.
- 5 September 2017: Three men, including two serving British soldiers, were arrested and later charged with several offences relating to membership of the neo-Nazi National Action terrorist organisation and preparing for acts of terrorism.
- 18 April 2018: Lewis Ludlow, aka Ali Hussain, nicknamed "The Eagle", a 26-year-old man, was arrested by Kent Police and the Counter Terrorism Police at his home address in Rochester, Kent. On 1 May 2018, following a custody extension, he appeared at Westminster Magistrates Court where he was charged with planning terrorist attacks on London tourist attractions, namely Oxford Street and Madame Tussauds. He was also charged with attempting to join Daesh, otherwise known as Islamic State, in the Philippines. He pleaded guilty at the Old Bailey on 10 August 2018, and was sentenced to life imprisonment.
- November 2020: Paul Dunleavy, a member of the proscribed neo-Nazi terrorist organisation Feuerkrieg Division, was jailed for five and a half years for preparing acts of terrorism.
- 1 April 2021: PC Benjamin Hannam of the Metropolitan Police was found guilty of being a member of the proscribed neo-Nazi terrorist organisation National Action and jailed for four years and four months.
- 18 January 2022: An unidentified fourteen-year-old pleaded guilty to three offences under section 58 of the Terrorism Act 2000.
- 23 June 2022: Four members of a far-right cell were found guilty of offences including the encouragement of terrorism and disseminating illegal terrorist materials online.
- 28 April 2023: White supremacist Vaughn Dolphin was convicted of several terror offences, two counts of possessing explosive materials, and one firearms offence. A court was told that Dolphin had obtained illegal materials on how to construct a shotgun and make plastic explosive, and had constructed a viable firearm in his shed. Dolphin had also tried to create explosives in his aunt's kitchen, which resulted in a "fireball" when his blast mixture caught fire.
- 17 July 2023: Anjem Choudary, the suspected interim leader of the terrorist group Al-Muhajiroun, was arrested for directing terrorism after a lengthy undercover investigation. One of Choudary's followers, Khaled Hussain, was arrested the same day at Heathrow Airport for membership in a proscribed organisation. The two men stood trial at Woolwich Crown Court in July 2024, and on 1 August the court sentenced Choudary to life imprisonment and Hussain to imprisonment for five years.
- 31 August 2023: Ashley Podsiad-Sharp was jailed for eight years after being convicted of possessing a terrorist handbook entitled "White Resistance Manual".
- 14 June 2024: A 19-year old Neo-Nazi was sentenced to 8 years in custody with 5 years on license for planning to suicide bomb a synagogue as well as possessing and distributing terroristic materials and publications. He had been arrested in June 2023.
- 28 July 2024: Right-wing activist Tommy Robinson was arrested and charged under schedule 7 of the Terrorism Act for refusing allow police officers access to the contents of his mobile phone after being stopped at the Channel Tunnel. Robinson stood trial and was acquitted after a judge found that the police had acted unlawfully in stopping him.
- 16 August 2024: Rex Clark and Sofia Vinogradova are arrested in Hertfordshire for an extreme right-wing terror plot.
- 14 March 2025: A man in Birmingham was charged with inviting support for the terror group Hamas.
- 22 May 2025: Irish rapper Liam O'Hanna was charged with displaying symbols in support of a terror group for allegedly waving a Hezbollah flag during a concert. The charges were later dismissed over a procedural error.
- July 2025-Present: Following the proscription of Palestine Action in July 2025, groups of protesters associating themselves with Palestine Action have repeatedly held up signs, worn t-shirts or otherwise made an expression of written support for the proscribed organisation Palestine Action, usually at protests associated with the war in Gaza. A key objective of the protests is to force police to enforce the proscription, absorbing police resources with arrests of non-violent, sometimes elderly protesters, giving credence to the claim the group is not composed predominantly of people aiming to commit terrorist acts. Members of Palestine Action have been prosecuted for carrying out direct action with a terrorism aggravation applied, most prominently the Filton 4, who broke into the Israel-linked Elbit Systems factory in 2024. The Supreme Court is currently considering the proscription case following disagreement between the lower courts. If the Supreme Court rules that the group must be removed from the proscription list, it could have significant ramifications across cases associated with the group, including the withdrawal of cases against those arrested and the resentencing of those convicted with a terrorism aggravation. A ruling in favour of Palestine Action would also likely result in ramifications for the current interpretation of terrorism legislation and the power to proscribe in the event of direct action.

== See also ==
- List of terrorist incidents in London
- List of people convicted under Anti-Terrorism Act in the United Kingdom
- Prevention of Terrorism Act (Northern Ireland)
