= List of people convicted under Terrorism Acts in the United Kingdom =

The following is a list of known convictions under the Terrorism Acts passed by Parliament of the United Kingdom since 2000.

== Convictions by date ==
=== 2003 ===
- Mohammed Abdullah Azam, convicted of "collecting information" related to terrorism in March 2003.

=== 2005 ===
- Saajid Badat, sentenced to 13 years' imprisonment for "conspiring to place a device on an aircraft in service". His co-conspirator, Richard Reid, was convicted of terrorism offences in the United States.
- Tariq Al-Daour, sentenced to 6 1/2 years' imprisonment for "inciting another person to commit an act of terrorism wholly or partly outside the UK which would, if committed in England and Wales, constitute murder" and conspiracy to defraud banks and credit companies.
- Waseem Mughal, sentenced to 7 1/2 years' imprisonment for "inciting another person to commit an act of terrorism wholly or partly outside the UK which would, if committed in England and Wales, constitute murder" and conspiracy to defraud banks and credit companies.
- Younes Tsouli, sentenced to 10 years' imprisonment for "inciting another person to commit an act of terrorism wholly or partly outside the UK which would, if committed in England and Wales, constitute murder" and conspiracy to defraud banks and credit companies.

=== 2006 ===
- Abu Hamza al-Masri, sentenced to 7 years' imprisonment for "possessing a document containing information likely to be useful to a person committing or preparing an act of terrorism". Hamza was extradited to the United States in 2012 to face further terrorism charges.

=== 2007 ===
- Umran Javed, convicted of soliciting murder, sentenced to 6 years' imprisonment.
- Abdul Muhid, convicted of soliciting murder, sentenced to 6 years' imprisonment. Convicted of further terrorism offences in 2008.
- Mizanur Rahman, convicted of soliciting murder, sentenced to 6 years' imprisonment. Convicted of further terrorism offences in 2016.
- Omar Altimimi, convicted of six counts of possessing computer files connected with the preparation or instigation of an act of terrorism under the Terrorism Act 2000,

==== 21/7 bomb plot convictions ====
- Muktar Said Ibrahim, convicted of conspiracy to murder, sentenced to life imprisonment with a minimum term of 40 years.
- Hamdi Adus Isaac, convicted of conspiracy to murder, sentenced to life imprisonment with a minimum term of 40 years. Also known as Osman Hussain, Hussain Osman, or Hamdi Isaac.
- Ramzi Mohammed, convicted of conspiracy to murder, sentenced to life imprisonment with a minimum term of 40 years.
- Yasin Hassan Omar, convicted of conspiracy to murder, sentenced to life imprisonment with a minimum term of 40 years.
- Adel Yahya, convicted of collecting information likely to be useful to terrorists, sentenced to 6 years and 9 months' imprisonment.
- Manfo Kwaku Asiedu, convicted of conspiracy to cause explosions, sentenced to 33 years' imprisonment. Also known as George Nanak Marquaye or Sumaila Abubakari.

=== 2008 ===
- Ibrahim Hassan, convicted of inciting terrorism overseas.
- Abu Izzadeen, convicted of terrorist fundraising and inciting terror overseas.
- Sulayman Keeler, convicted of terrorist fundraising and inciting terror overseas.
- Abdul Muhid, convicted of fund-raising for terrorists.
- Abdul Saleem, convicted of inciting terrorism overseas.
- Rangzieb Ahmed, convicted of belonging to a proscribed organisation (namely Al Qaeda).
- Habib Ahmed, convicted of belonging to a proscribed organisation (namely Al Qaeda).

==== 21/7 bomb plot convictions ====
- Wahbi Mohammed, convicted of assisting the plotters, sentenced to 17 years' imprisonment.
- Siraj Ali, convicted of assisting the plotters, sentenced to 12 years' imprisonment.
- Abdul Sherif, convicted of assisting the plotters, sentenced to 10 years' imprisonment.
- Ismail Abdurahman, convicted of assisting the plotters, sentenced to 10 years' imprisonment.
- Muhedin Ali, convicted of assisting the plotters, sentenced to 7 years' imprisonment.
- Yeshi Girma, convicted of failing to inform the police about the plot, sentenced to 15 years' imprisonment.
- Fardosa Abdullahi, convicted of assisting the plotters, sentenced to 3 years' imprisonment.
- Esayas Girma, convicted of assisting the plotters, sentenced to 10 years' imprisonment.
- Mulu Girma, convicted of assisting the plotters, sentenced to 10 years' imprisonment.
- Mohamed Kabashi, convicted of assisting the plotters, sentenced to 10 years' imprisonment.

==== Transatlantic aircraft plot convictions ====
- Ahmed Abdullah Ali, convicted of conspiracy to murder and conspiracy to murder using explosives on aircraft, sentenced to life with a minimum term of 40 years' imprisonment.
- Tanvir Hussain, convicted of conspiracy to murder and conspiracy to murder using explosives on aircraft, sentenced to life with a minimum term of 32 years' imprisonment .
- Arafat Khan, convicted of conspiracy to murder, sentenced to life with a minimum term of 20 years' imprisonment.
- Assad Sarwar, convicted of conspiracy to murder and conspiracy to murder using explosives on aircraft, sentenced to life with a minimum term of 36 years' imprisonment.
- Ibrahim Savant, convicted of conspiracy to murder, sentenced to life with a minimum term of 20 years' imprisonment.
- Waheed Zaman, convicted of conspiracy to murder, sentenced to life with a minimum term of 20 years' imprisonment.

=== 2016 ===
- Anjem Choudary - On 5 August 2015, Choudary was charged with one offence under section 12 of the Terrorism Act 2000 for inviting support of a proscribed organisation, namely Islamic State, between June 2014 and March 2015. An expected trial date of 7 March 2016 was given, but the trial was postponed to 27 June 2016, and was expected to last no more than four weeks. Choudary was convicted on 28 July 2016. At the Old Bailey on 6 September 2016, Mr Justice Holroyde sentenced Choudary to five years and six months in prison, telling him that he had "crossed the line between the legitimate expression of your own views and a criminal act".
- Mizanur Rahman - On 28 July 2016, Rahman was convicted alongside Anjem Choudary of inviting support for a proscribed organisation, ISIS. Reporting restrictions were imposed on the conviction, preventing its publication until 16 August 2016. Rahman was sentenced to 5 years and 6 months imprisonment.

=== 2018 ===
Umar Haque, convicted 2 March 2018 at the Old Bailey London of a range of offences including plotting terrorist attacks, and collecting information useful for terrorism. In addition, he tried to create a jihadist child army in London through his teaching (despite being not a teacher but only an administrator and having no teaching qualifications) at Ripple Road Mosque / Essex Islamic Academy and the Lantern of Knowledge school.

=== 2025 ===
- Mohammad Sohail Farooq – sentenced 21 March 2025 at Sheffield Crown Court to life imprisonment with a minimum term of 37 years for plotting to attack RAF Menwith Hill and St James’s University Hospital; convicted (July 2024) of preparing for an act of terrorism contrary to section 5 of the Terrorism Act 2006, possessing an explosive substance with intent to endanger life, firearms offences, and possession of terrorist material, after showing an improvised bomb and imitation firearm at St James’s Hospital grounds.
- Farishta Jami – sentenced 10 April 2025 at Leicester Crown Court to life imprisonment with a minimum term of 17 years after conviction in mid-February 2025 on two counts of engaging in conduct in preparation for terrorism under section 5 of the Terrorism Act 2006 (planning to travel with children to join Daesh in Afghanistan, research on weaponry including AK47 assembly).
- Jason Savage – sentenced 11 April 2025 at Birmingham Crown Court to life imprisonment with a minimum term of 16 years for planning an attack against a mosque and a bookshop in Birmingham; convicted following trial on engaging in conduct in preparation for terrorism contrary to section 5 of the Terrorism Act 2006 (reconnaissance videos, research on weapons, expressed intention “see him in paradise”, under cover arrest).
- Hakan Barac – from Newport. Sentenced 7 April 2025 at Bristol Crown Court to 3 years 9 months’ imprisonment after pleading guilty to five offences of dissemination of terrorist publications and one offence of supporting a proscribed organisation (Islamic State). .
- Leo Walby – from Swanley, Kent. Sentenced 9 May 2025 at the Old Bailey to four and a half years’ imprisonment after pleading guilty 2 April 2025 to six counts of dissemination of terrorist material contrary to section 2 of the Terrorism Act 2006 and one count of failing to disclose a password under the Regulation of Investigatory Powers Act 2000 section 53.
- Tobias Gleed – from Honiton, Devon. Sentenced 17 April 2025 at Winchester Crown Court to five years and six months’ imprisonment (to serve two-thirds plus one year on licence) and a five-year Serious Crime Prevention Order after conviction (trial) for: four offences of possession of a document likely to be useful for terrorism under section 58(1)(b) of the Terrorism Act 2000; two offences of distributing terrorist publications under section 2(2)(e) of the Terrorism Act 2006; two offences of providing a service facilitating access to terrorist publications under section 2(2)(d) of the Terrorism Act 2006.
- Vitor Dias – from Willesden, London. Sentenced 24 April 2025 at the Old Bailey to three years’ imprisonment after conviction 5 August 2024 for four counts of possessing a document likely useful to terrorism under section 58(1)(b) of the Terrorism Act 2000 (extreme right-wing terrorism documents including bomb-making guide).
- Mohammed Hamad, Roshman Azad Wali Saeed, Tshko Ahmad Mohamad, Omar Hussain Ahmadi – combined sentences totaling almost 30 years (sentencing dates April 2024–May 2025) after convictions for dissemination of terrorism propaganda and fundraising for Islamic State via a WhatsApp group; sentences: Mohammed Hamad (4 years), Roshman Azad Wali Saeed (12 years), Tshko Ahmad Mohamad (7 years), Omar Hussain Ahmadi (5 years 7 months).
- Brogan Stewart, Marco Pitzettu and Christopher Ringrose – convicted 14 May 2025 at Sheffield Crown Court of planning a terrorist attack targeting mosques, Islamic education centres and synagogues as part of an extreme right-wing plot; guilty of engaging in conduct in preparation for terrorism contrary to section 5 of the Terrorism Act 2006 and multiple firearms offences (including illegal possession/manufacture of weapons, 3D-printed firearm).
- Oghenochuko Ojiri – Art dealer, sentenced 6 June 2025 at the Old Bailey to two years and six months’ imprisonment after pleading guilty 9 May 2025 to eight counts of failing to disclose during business transactions with a suspected Hezbollah financier, contrary to section 21A of the Terrorism Act 2000; first prosecution of its kind in the art market.

== See also ==
- 21 July 2005 London bombings
- 2006 transatlantic aircraft plot
- Terrorism Acts
