= 1976 London bombing =

1976 London bombing may refer to:

- January 1976 West End bombs
- Cannon Street train bombing
- West Ham station attack
- 1976 Olympia bombing
