= Nabeel Qureshi =

Nabeel Qureshi may refer to:

- Nabeel Qureshi (author) (1983–2017), American Christian apologist of Pakistani origin
- Nabeel Qureshi (director) (born 1985), Pakistani film director
