= David Wood (Christian apologist) =

American evangelical apologist (born 1976)

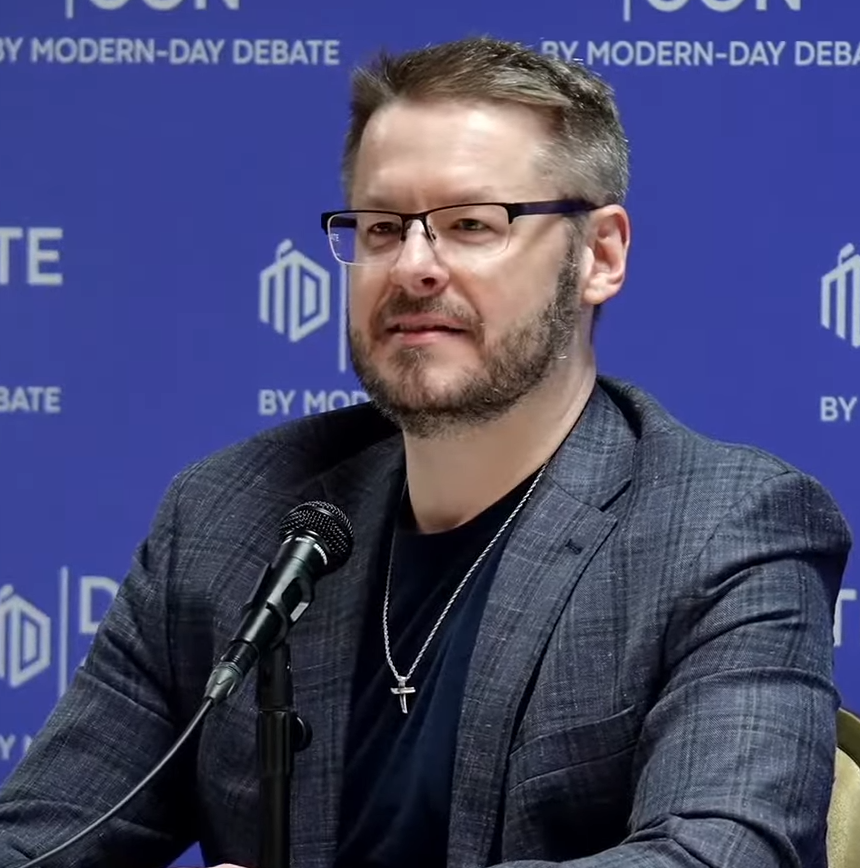
- Wood in 2025
- Born: April 7, 1976 (age 50)
- Education: Old Dominion University (BA, BS); Fordham University (MA, MPhil, PhD)
- Occupation: YouTuber
- Spouse: Marie Wood
- Children: 5

YouTube information
- Channels: Apologetics Roadshow; Acts 17 Polemics; Acts17Apologetics
- Genres: Christian apologetics; criticism of Islam
- Subscribers: 417,000 (Apologetics Roadshow); 132,000 (Acts 17 Polemics); 700,000 (Acts17Apologetics)
- Views: 61 million (Apologetics Roadshow); 12 million (Acts 17 Polemics); 159 million (Acts17Apologetics)
- Wood's voice (2025) Wood on his conversion to Christianity and faith.
- Last updated: March 22, 2026
- Website: acts17.com

David Wood (born April 7, 1976) is an American evangelical Christian apologist, philosopher, and YouTube personality, who is the head of the Acts 17 Apologetics ministry, which he co-founded with Nabeel Qureshi. He also runs Foundation for Advocating Christian Truth, which is the organization behind AnsweringMuslims.com. Within apologist polemicist circles, Wood is known for criticism of Islam and his views on theology and morality, as well as the Quran in general, hadith, sīrah and Muhammad.

== Early life and incarceration ==
Wood was an atheist in his youth, and stated that he had run-ins with the law by breaking into homes. He later smashed his father's head in with a hammer at the age of 18 in an attempt on his life, claiming a belief that morality was merely societal rules that were beneath him. He also said that after the assault on his father (who survived), Wood was diagnosed with antisocial personality disorder and was sentenced to ten years in prison for malicious wounding.

Wood later confessed in 2025 to engaging in sexual activities with two minors, ages 13 and 15, when he was 18 and out on bail in 1994. He claimed he did not care at the time, but acknowledged blame for his actions in his confession. Nonetheless, he faced public scrutiny after his confession for an alleged lack of remorse or empathy for the victims.

While in prison, he said, he was confronted with a fellow prisoner named Randy who was a Christian. Wood said he often challenged Randy's Christian beliefs, initially claiming that Randy was only a Christian because he was born into a primarily Christian society, specifically the United States. Wood stated that, while in prison, he and Randy frequently fasted, with Wood attempting to "beat" Randy at fasting, which eventually resulted in Wood being placed into solitary confinement under observation due to concerns over Wood potentially attempting to commit suicide by starvation. During this time, he began to read the Bible and participate in various Bible study programs in order to respond to Randy's rebuttals (thus "beating" him) but it eventually led Wood to convert to Christianity in 1996. His story has been discussed within the context of psychopathy and moral apologetics.

== Education ==
Wood said that after five years between jail and prison, he was released in 2000 and went to college at Old Dominion University where he completed an integrated double major, graduating in 2004 with two bachelor’s degrees, a Bachelor of Arts (BA) in Philosophy and a Bachelor of Science (BS) in Humanities. Wood wrote that while he was studying at Old Dominion University, he was challenged to convert to Islam by his friend, Nabeel Qureshi, then an Ahmadi Muslim, turned Christian, of Pakistani descent, and that he went about investigating the life of Muhammad using the earliest sources, including Ibn Ishaq's Life of Muhammad, one of the earliest extant biography of Muhammad, the hadith collections of Sahih al-Bukhari and Sahih Muslim, and the History of the Prophets and Kings by Al-Tabari. Wood said that he concluded that the Quran and Muhammad's example did not simply describe violence in the past as in the Bible, but rather commanded ongoing violence. As a result, Wood said he then became a Christian apologist. Qureshi later did so as well after converting to Christianity, following religious debates he engaged in with Wood.

Wood thereafter pursued graduate studies at Fordham University, earning a Master of Arts (MA) degree in Philosophy in 2008, a Master of Philosophy (MPhil) in 2010, and later completing a Doctor of Philosophy (PhD) in Philosophy of religion in 2013, publishing his dissertation Surprised by suffering: Hume, Draper, and the Bayesian argument from evil. Wood is also a member of the Society of Christian Philosophers and the Evangelical Philosophical Society.

== Christian apologetics ==
Wood has been described by fellow Christian apologists, New Testament scholar Michael R. Licona, and theologian William Lane Craig, as one of many apologists who "have stepped up to the plate and interacted seriously with Islam's truth claim," and a "prominent Christian thinker". Writing for The Catholic World Report, Christian apologist William Kilpatrick said that Wood on YouTube has made "highly effective short videos that set the record straight on areas of Christian-Muslim disagreement," and that he "comes across as the quintessence of calm, controlled manhood. Armed with a winning sense of humor, a razor-sharp mind, and a ton of knowledge, Wood doesn’t even have to raise his voice to make his points." His YouTube page has furthermore been described by another apologist, Scott Ventureyra, as "a great resource with debates, testimonies and much important information concerning Islam, Muhammad, the hadith, sirah and Qur’an".

In addition to YouTube, Wood has participated in more than fifty moderated public debates with Muslims and atheists, including debates with Muslim scholars like Dr Shabir Ally. He has also hosted the satellite television talk show "Jesus or Muhammad?" on the Aramaic Broadcast Network. In 2008, Wood, Qureshi and Acts 17 Apologetics organized several debates in Norfolk, Virginia at the Old Dominion University and the Central Baptist Church in Ghent titled "Christianity vs. Islam," which included Muslim debaters Shadid Lewis, Nadir Ahmed and Sami Zaatari.

Wood and Qureshi were involved with preaching to Muslims at an Arab festival in Dearborn, Michigan in 2009. They were then ejected for filming interviews at a Muslim booth, after which they protested with YouTube videos titled "Sharia in the U.S." In 2010, Wood and three other evangelists were arrested outside Dearborn, after again preaching at the Arab festival and being charged with a misdemeanor of disturbing the peace, but they were later acquitted. In May 2013, the City of Dearborn was required to post a public apology to be maintained on the City's website for three years and pay $300,000 to Wood and his three compatriots.

Wood opposed the Park51 Islamic Center in New York City, dubbed the "Ground Zero Mosque," arguing that it was not meant to honor the victims' families, but instead was a symbol of Islamic victory and named Cordoba House in memory of the Islamic conquest of Spain by the Umayyad Caliphate which later formed the Caliphate of Córdoba. He participated in a rally against the Islamic center in 2010 organized by Stop Islamization of America, in which he accidentally nearly caused a riot by giving out pamphlets about Islam to two Christian Copts who wanted something to distribute, but who were mistakenly thought by the crowd to be Muslims. He produced a viral YouTube video in connection with the event titled "Of Mosques and Men" that received over 2 million views.

Wood has also been described as a part of the counter-jihad, a far-right anti-Muslim movement.

British criminal Mohiussunnath Chowdhury, who was arrested for attacking two police officers outside Buckingham Palace with a sword in 2017, had repeatedly shared videos of Wood on Telegram. While describing Wood as a "hardcore enemy of Allah" and stating that "some videos I don't watch where he mocks Islam," he noted that "his other videos are more truthful than the majority of Islamic speakers". Lizzie Dearden, writing in The Independent, reported that Chowdhury was "consuming a considerable degree of right-wing literature presenting Islam as inherently violent, from anti-immigrant activist Tommy Robinson, Robert Spencer’s website Jihad Watch, and the American anti-Islam preacher David Wood." She concluded that Chowdhury relied on these sources to reinforce his thinking.

On May 26, 2022, Wood announced his plan to delete his YouTube channel, due to what he saw as an increase in censorship and the banning of many of his videos. Wood encouraged his fans to re-upload his videos onto their own YouTube channels if they wished to keep them on the site. On July 3, he changed his plans in response to Hatun Tash being robbed and arrested at Speakers' Corner, opting instead to delete his videos and transfer ownership of the channel to Tash. Tash had earlier appeared on YouTube together with Wood, discussing how she had been warned by police following previous attacks against her. In August 2022, Wood returned to YouTube under the name Apologetics Roadshow.

== Personal life ==
Wood met his wife Marie, then an atheist, while in university; she also became a Christian. They live in the Bronx, New York City, and had five sons, two of whom suffered from centronuclear myopathy. On April 17, 2023, he stated that his third son, one of the two diagnosed with the condition, had died the previous day at the age of 15.
