= Operation Pitsford =

- Date: September 19, 2011
- Time: before 00:00 BST (UTC+01:00)
- Location: Ladypool Road, Birmingham, United Kingdom
- Suspects: Irfan Naseer; Shahid Kasam Khan; Khobaib Hussain; Ishaaq Hussain; Narweed Ali; Irfan Khalid; Ashik Ali; Rahin Ahmed; Bahader Ali; Mohammed Rizwan; Mujahid Hussain
- Charges: terrorism-related offenses under the Terrorism Act 2006
- Verdict: Guilty
- Convictions: Sentenced to prison terms ranging from 40 months to life imprisonment

Operation Pitsford is a counter-terrorism investigation by the British police that has resulted in twelve people so far being arrested and charged with offences under the Terrorism Act 2006.

On 19 September 2011 West Midlands Police arrested a woman who lived in the Alum Rock area of Birmingham. Salma Kabal, 22, appeared in court on 16 November 2011 accused of failing to inform police that her husband, Ashik Ali, planned to kill himself in a suicide bomb attack. The official charge was that she “knew or believed might be of material assistance in securing the apprehension, prosecution or conviction of another person for an offence involving the commission, preparation or instigation of an act of terrorism".

On 15 November 2011 West Midlands Counter Terrorism Unit arrested four people at their homes who were from Sparkhill Birmingham, on suspicion of conducting terrorist offences. The four men appeared in court in Westminster London on 19 November 2011 charged with terrorism offences. They were named as Khobaib Hussain, Ishaaq Hussain and Shahid Kasam Khan, all 19, and Naweed Mahmood Ali, 24. They were charged with fundraising for terrorist purposes and for travelling to Pakistan for terrorist training.

On 26 April 2013, eleven British Muslims were sentenced to prison terms ranging from 40 months to life imprisonment.
