= Talbot Street bomb-making haul =

2006 arrest of two men in England

The Talbot Street bomb-making haul, on 28 September 2006, had two men arrested in the north of England and charged under the Explosive Substances Act 1883 for the possession of rocket launchers and a large haul of explosives-making chemicals. The case went virtually unreported in the national press until the trial.

The trial began on 12 February 2007. One man pleaded guilty of possession of explosives, the other denied all charges.

== Arrests ==
On 28 September 2006, Robert Cottage, a former candidate for the British National Party, was arrested at his home in Talbot Street, Colne. The police claimed to have recovered chemical components which could be used to make explosives. They believe it is the largest haul ever discovered in someone's home in England. He was charged under the Explosive Substances Act 1883 on 2 October.

The police operation had been sparked off when Robert Cottage's wife told a social worker that her husband had several crossbows and chemicals stored in his home.

Police Superintendent Neil Smith said: "He's not a terrorist and it's not a bomb factory but we are interested in what we have seized from his house. It will take expert advice to establish exactly what he has got. He was arrested under the Explosive Substances Act 1883 on suspicion of possessing chemical substances that aren't in themselves an offence to possess but if combined may be capable of making an explosion."

On 29 September 2006, David Bolus Jackson, a retired dentist, was arrested in Grange-over-Sands and also charged under the Explosive Substances Act 1883 on 2 October. His house in Trent Road, Nelson, Lancashire was also searched, and the prosecutor in the case reported that rocket launchers, chemicals, BNP literature and a nuclear biological suit were uncovered. The prosecutor also alleged that the pair had "some kind of master plan".

Both men were remanded in custody and were due to appear at Burnley Crown Court on 23 October, but actually appeared in Preston Crown Court a day later where the trial was adjourned until 15 January 2007 (see Discussion page), with a trial date set for 12 February in the Manchester Crown Court.

No charges have been brought under any of the Terrorism Acts.

== Criticism of media coverage of arrests ==
There was no coverage of the arrests on the BBC, and very little in the national papers, beyond a paragraph in "Newsbriefs" in The Sunday Times, as well as socialist newspaper The Morning Star.

It has been suggested that had the arrested being suspected Islamic extremists, rather than fascist extremists, the arrests would have been front-page news immediately. The trial itself, however, received more coverage in the mainstream media.

== The trial ==
The trial began in Manchester Crown Court on 13 February 2007.

Robert Cottage pleaded guilty to possession of explosives but denied conspiracy to cause an explosion, claiming that he needed the materials to deter attacks on his property because he believed that the political and financial condition of the UK would deteriorate into civil war within a few years.

The prosecution cited statements from his wife that he wanted to shoot Tony Blair and local Liberal Democrat peer Lord Greaves, and held strong views on immigration. He was also alleged to possess a copy on his computer of the Anarchist Cookbook, which includes bomb-making information, as well as crossbows and four air-rifles. His wife told the court that "I have seen a change in Rob since he became involved with the BNP four years ago (after being a member of the Conservative Party for 23 years)." "The BNP made mine and Rob's marriage suffer. It drove a wedge between us."

The jury was discharged after failing to reach a majority verdict during three days of deliberations. Prosecutor Louise Blackwell said the Crown Prosecution Service would apply for a retrial.

== The retrial ==
Both men were cleared on 12 July of conspiracy to cause explosions after the judge dismissed the jury, although Cottage was found guilty of possessing chemicals unlawfully and sentenced to two and a half years imprisonment.

== See also ==
- Tony Lecomber
- British National Party
- Wood Green ricin plot
