= Omar Altimimi =

Dutch criminal

Omar Altimimi (born 6 August 1965) is a Dutch national of Bolton, England convicted of six counts of possessing computer files connected with the preparation or instigation of an act of terrorism under the Terrorism Act 2000, as well as two charges of money laundering under the Proceeds of Crime Act 2002. He is currently serving a nine-year sentence for these convictions.

A police statement said the material found on Altimimi's computer as well as his association with Jerome Curtailler (who is imprisoned under charges of plotting to blow up the American embassy in Paris) suggest he was a terrorist 'sleeper' caught before he had chance to strike. Altimimi's conviction is an example of preventative justice, where a person has been criminalised under the recent Terrorism Acts for the possession of information and people with whom they choose to associate.
