= Explosive Substances Act 1883 =

Act of the Parliament of the United Kingdom

Explosive Substances Act 1883 (Note: Section 1.)
- Act of Parliament
- Parliament of the United Kingdom
- Long title: An Act to amend the Law relating to Explosive Substances.
- Citation: 46 & 47 Vict. c. 3
- Territorial extent: United Kingdom

Dates
- Royal assent: 10 April 1883
- Commencement: 10 April 1883 (Note: The Acts of Parliament (Commencement) Act 1793.)
Other legislation
Amended by	Criminal Law Act 1967; Civil Evidence Act 1968; Sheriff Courts (Scotland) Act 1971; Criminal Jurisdiction Act 1975; Criminal Law Act 1977; Criminal Law (Amendment) (Northern Ireland) Order 1977; Administration of Justice Act 1982; Police and Criminal Evidence Act 1984; Statute Law (Repeals) Act 1989; Merchant Shipping Act 1995; Law Officers Act 1997; Access to Justice Act 1999; Courts Act 2003; Criminal Justice Act 2003; Civil Partnership Act 2004; Terrorism Act 2006; Criminal Justice and Courts Act 2015; Justice Act (Northern Ireland) 2015
Relates to	Merchant Shipping Act 1873; Explosives Act 1875

Status: Amended

Text of statute as originally enacted

Revised text of statute as amended

Text of the Explosive Substances Act 1883 as in force today (including any amendments) within the United Kingdom, from legislation.gov.uk.

The Explosive Substances Act 1883 (46 & 47 Vict. c. 3) is an act of the Parliament of the United Kingdom. It makes it illegal to use (or conspire or intend to use) any explosive substance to cause an explosion likely to endanger life or cause serious injury to property, whether or not any explosion actually takes place. A person guilty of an offence under this law is liable to life imprisonment.

Under the act, it is also an offence, subject to imprisonment for life, to possess explosives under suspicious circumstances.

Anyone who helps someone to commit a crime under this law by providing money, materials, premises, or any other assistance is tried and punished as severely as the person who actually uses the explosives.

The act applies to people within the territorial extent of the United Kingdom as well as to citizens of the United Kingdom acting within the Republic of Ireland.

Witnesses who are called during the official investigation or the trial can be arrested to prevent them from absconding and do not have the right of silence to protect themselves from self-incrimination. On the other hand, self-incriminating evidence from a witness cannot be used in a different criminal or civil proceeding.

== Application ==
Any instance of terrorism involving any kind of bomb is necessarily a crime under the act (as well as being a crime under the law against attempted murder). In fact, for many decades the Explosive Substances Act was the basis for the prosecution of terrorist cases, such as S-Plan in 1939, the Birmingham Six in 1975, Tony Lecomber in 1985, and the Talbot Street bomb-making haul in 2006.

Since 2000, there has been a series of special terrorism laws which appear to supersede the Explosive Substances Act in that they can also be used to investigate and prosecute those who misuse explosives to endanger life and property for illegitimate purposes (usually to further their own political causes).

The terrorism acts have been applied in the cases such as the 2004 Financial buildings plot and 2006 transatlantic aircraft plot in which the intent to misuse explosives is alleged. However, since no actual explosive substances have been found, the Explosive Substances Act cannot be made to apply.

A recent use of the act was against Iraqi doctor Bilal Abdullah, who became the first person charged over the London and Glasgow car bomb attacks in 2007. Abdullah, who was arrested after a flaming Jeep was driven into the doors of the arrivals hall at Glasgow Airport. The 27-year-old, who was working as a doctor at the Royal Alexandra Hospital in Paisley, Scotland, before his arrest, was charged with conspiring to cause explosions under the Explosive Substances Act. The charge alleges he "unlawfully and maliciously conspired with others to cause explosions of a nature likely to endanger life or cause serious injury to property in the United Kingdom".

In April 2015, Faris al-Khori, a former Syrian doctor, was jailed for 40 months under the Explosives Substances Act for possessing explosive ingredients and bomb-making instructions in properties in Edinburgh.

== Subsequent developments ==
Section 7(4) of the act was repealed by section 1(1) of, and group 5 of part I of schedule 1 to, the Statute Law (Repeals) Act 1989, which came into force on 16 November 1989.
