= Nabeel Qureshi (writer) =

Pakistani-American author (1983–2017)

- Qureshi in 2011
- Born: Nabeel Asif Qureshi; April 13, 1983; San Diego, California, U.S.
- Died: September 16, 2017 (aged 34); Houston, Texas, U.S.
- Education: Old Dominion University (BA); Biola University (MA); Eastern Virginia Medical School (MD); Duke University (MA); University of Oxford (MPhil)
- Occupation: Christian evangelist
- Known for: Conversion to Christianity from Ahmadiyya
- Spouse: Michelle Qureshi (m. 2008)
- Children: 1 (Ayah Qureshi)
- Website: www.nabeelqureshi.com

Nabeel Asif Qureshi (Urdu: نبیل قریشی; April 13, 1983 – September 16, 2017) was a Pakistani-American evangelical Christian apologist. Raised in a devout Ahmadi Muslim family, Qureshi converted to Christianity as a university student following several years of debate with David Wood.

After earning his doctorate in medicine from Eastern Virginia Medical School, Qureshi subsequently completed an M.A. in religion at Duke University and an MPhil in Judaism and Christianity at the University of Oxford, becoming a Christian apologist with Ravi Zacharias International Ministries from 2013 until 2017.

Qureshi authored three books: Seeking Allah, Finding Jesus: A Devout Muslim Encounters Christianity, Answering Jihad: A Better Way Forward, and No God But One: Allah or Jesus. In August 2016, Qureshi announced that he had been diagnosed with stage IV stomach cancer. After a year of treatment, he died on September 16, 2017.

== Biography ==
Qureshi was born in San Diego, California, to Pakistani Ahmadi Muslim parents who immigrated to the United States. His father served in the U.S. Navy throughout Qureshi's childhood, ultimately becoming a lieutenant commander before retiring. Qureshi described his childhood home in positive terms, stating that his parents "modeled love for others and love for country".

In 2001, Qureshi attended Old Dominion University in Virginia and served as the president of the Pre-Medical Honor Society. He also studied Islamic apologetics and engaged Christians in religious discussions. After one such discussion with a Christian at Old Dominion University, David Wood, the two became friends and began a years-long debate on the historical claims of Christianity and Islam. According to Qureshi, Wood encouraged him to research Christianity and Islam in an equally objective light. Qureshi recounted that he had been happy with his faith and with his Ahmadi community and did not want to leave it, but he ultimately converted to Christianity after years of dialogue with Wood. He described his conversion as "the most painful thing [he] ever did" because he subsequently lost most of his friendships and relationships with fellow Muslims.

=== Education and career ===
Qureshi chronicled the story of his personal conversion in his first book, Seeking Allah, Finding Jesus, which became a New York Times bestseller, and was awarded the Christian Book Award for the categories of both "Best New Author" and "Best Non-Fiction" of 2015, the first time in award history. Afterwards, Christianity Today heralded Qureshi as one of "33 Under 33" in its cover story on emerging religious leaders in July 2014.

After graduating from Old Dominion University with a Bachelor of Arts (B.A.) in Biology and Chemistry in 2005, Qureshi attended the Eastern Virginia Medical School, where he completed a Doctor of Medicine (M.D.) degree in 2009. He subsequently decided to spend his life studying and preaching the Christian Gospel and became a speaker for Ravi Zacharias International Ministries. He obtained a Master of Arts (M.A.) in Christian Apologetics at Biola University in 2008 and a Master of Arts (M.A.) in Religion, focusing on Christian apologetics and New Testament studies, at Duke University in 2012. He earned a Master of Philosophy (M.Phil.) degree in Judaism and Christianity at the University of Oxford in 2015 and was engaged in doctoral research toward a Doctor of Philosophy (D.Phil.) in the same field, focusing on New Testament studies, at Oxford at the time of his death in 2017. Qureshi lectured to students at over one hundred universities, including the University of Oxford, Columbia University, Dartmouth College, Cornell University, Biola University, Johns Hopkins University, and the University of Hong Kong. "He participated in 18 moderated, public debates around North America, Europe, and Asia." In 2015, Qureshi debated at Wayne State University with Muslim scholar Shabir Ally.

=== 2010 arrest and apology from city of Dearborn ===
On June 18, 2010, Qureshi was arrested at the Dearborn Arab Festival in Michigan along with David Wood, and Paul Rezkalla on charges of "breach of peace". The city of Dearborn later determined that Qureshi, Wood, and Rezkalla had been "engaging in a peaceful dialogue about their Christian faith with several festival attendees" but that the arrest had been made based on misinformation from some of the festival workers and attendees. Soon afterwards, Dearborn mayor John B. O'Reilly Jr. released a statement defending the arrests, saying, "The real violation of First Amendment rights occurs with Acts 17 Apologetics trying to imply they were the victim, when the real violation is their attack on the City of Dearborn for having tolerance for all religions including believers in the Qur'an."

Qureshi, Wood, and Rezkalla were acquitted shortly afterwards when video evidence indicated that, during the festival, they were being asked questions by a small crowd of Muslim teenagers and were not disturbing the peace. After their acquittal, the three filed a separate civil suit against Mayor O'Reilly, police chief Ronald Haddad, 17 police officers, and others, with American Freedom Law Center advocating on their behalf. The court ruled in favor of Qureshi, Wood, and Rezkalla, finding that the city had violated their constitutional rights and that there was no basis in law for their arrest. In 2013, the city then settled the suit. As part of the settlement, the city was required to issue a formal apology and maintain that apology on their website for three years. O'Reilly accepted the verdict, pointing to their court's decision that the arrest had been unfounded. Robert Muise, speaking on behalf of American Freedom Law Center, praised the decision and called for the festival attendees who had supplied the incorrect information leading to the arrest to also be held accountable.

As a result of the events in Dearborn, Acts 17 Apologetics became focused on "free speech, sharia in the West, and Islam." This led Qureshi to leave and start Creed 2:6 ministries, which focused on sharing the gospel. Qureshi joined Ravi Zacharias International Ministries in 2013.

=== Commentary on international Muslim terrorism ===
Following the 2016 Brussels bombings and the rise of the Islamic State in Iraq and Syria, Qureshi wrote an op-ed in USA Today stating that, from his perspective, Islamic terrorism stemmed from a literal interpretation of the Quran, specifically Surah 9. He further wrote that he believed this to be the most accurate understanding of the Quran but noted that most Muslims do not subscribe to this interpretation. When Muslim writers responded critically to this assessment, Qureshi wrote another op-ed for the Huffington Post stating that he appreciated the response to his initial article and welcomed dialogue, adding, "Such public dialogue and discussion is the key to moving forward and addressing the roots of jihad." He developed this position further in his second book, Answering Jihad, and discussed his views during an interview with Fox News.

== Personal life ==
Qureshi was married to Michelle. The couple had one daughter, Ayah, born in August 2015 and named after a Christian martyr.

== Cancer diagnosis and death ==
On 30 August 2016, Qureshi announced that he was in the advanced stages of stomach cancer. He wrote on Facebook, "This is an announcement that I never expected to make, but God in His infinite and sovereign wisdom has chosen me for this refining, and I pray He will be glorified through my body and my spirit. My family and I have received the news that I have advanced stomach cancer, and the clinical prognosis is quite grim. Nonetheless, we are going to pursue healing aggressively, both medical and miraculous, relying on God and the fact that He is able to do immeasurably more than all we ask or imagine."

On September 8, 2017, after having undergone several months of treatment, including the surgical removal of his stomach, Qureshi posted a video on social media that he had been placed on hospice care. In the same video, he encouraged followers to engage in respectful interfaith dialogue, saying, "As you consider my ministry, I hope it leaves a legacy of love, of peace, of truth, of caring for one another. That's my hope and my purpose behind this." During his illness, Qureshi was working on completing a DPhil in New Testament studies at the University of Oxford. He died of stomach cancer on September 16, 2017, at the age of 34. Two months later, Qureshi's father, a practicing Ahmadi, posted a video thanking Qureshi's followers for their support and prayers for the family following his death.

== Works ==
- Seeking Allah, Finding Jesus: A Devout Muslim Encounters Christianity (Zondervan, February 2014)
- Answering Jihad: A Better Way Forward (Zondervan, March 2016)
- No God But One—Allah or Jesus (Zondervan, August 2016)
