= Yonah Alexander =

Author and lecturer on terrorism (1931–2024)

- Born: December 25, 1931
- Died: April 25, 2024 (aged 92)
- Education: Ph.D. from Columbia University, MA from the University of Chicago, BA from Roosevelt University of Chicago
- Occupation(s): Author, Lecturer
- Known for: Specialization in the study of terrorism, Founding and editing academic journals on terrorism and minority rights, Member of the Bipartisan Commission on Biodefense
- Notable work: "Combating terrorism: strategies of ten countries," "Europe's red terrorists: the fighting communist organizations," "The New Iranian Leadership: Ahmadinejad, Nuclear Ambition, and the Middle East," "Turkey: Terrorism, Civil Rights, and the European Union"

Yonah Alexander (25 December 1931 – 25 April 2024) was an author and lecturer who specializes in the study of terrorism.

Alexander died on 25 April 2024, at the age of 92.

== Educational background ==
Alexander received his PhD from Columbia University, an MA from the University of Chicago, and his BA from Roosevelt University of Chicago.

== Academic journals ==
Alexander founded and edited the journals Terrorism An International Journal in 1977, International Journal on Minorities and Group Rights

== Biodefense ==
Yonah also served as a member of the Bipartisan Commission on Biodefense, a group that encourages and advocates changes to government policy to strengthen national biodefense. In order to address biological threats facing the nation, the Commission created a 33-step initiative for the U.S. Government to implement. Headed by former Senator Joe Lieberman and former Governor Tom Ridge, the Commission assembled in 2014 in Washington D.C. for four meetings concerning current biodefense programs and concluded that the federal government had little to no defense mechanisms in case of a biological event. The Commission report, The National Blueprint for Biodefense, proposed a string of solutions and recommendations for the U.S. Government to take, including items such as giving the Vice President authority over biodefense responsibilities and merging the entire biodefense budget. These solutions represented the Commission's call to action in order to increase awareness and activity for pandemic related issues.

== Published works ==
- Combating terrorism: strategies of ten countries University of Michigan Press 31 August 2002. ISBN 978-0-472-09824-8
- Europe's red terrorists: the fighting communist organizations Routledge 1 October 1992. ISBN 978-0-7146-3488-3
- The New Iranian Leadership: Ahmadinejad, Nuclear Ambition, and the Middle East Praeger 30 December 2007. ISBN 978-0-275-99639-0
- Turkey: Terrorism, Civil Rights, and the European Union Routledge. ISBN 0-415-44163-3
