= 2018 London "army of children" plot =

Terrorist plot in the UK

In March 2018, Umar Haque, an instructor at the Islamic Studies class at Ripple Road Mosque's "Essex Islamic Academy" in Barking, London, was convicted of trying to recruit an "army of children" to launch a series of ISIS-inspired attacks on dozens of targets across London. Umar Haque had no formal teaching qualifications. Also convicted were Abuthaher Mamun, who was accused of research and finance help to Haque; and Haque's confidant, Muhammad Abid, who failed to alert the police.

Haque had the boys take part in role-playing games, in which they simulated an attack on London. Haque showed a video of a decomposed boy, as a warning of what would happen to them if they did not swear to become martyrs.

The plan was to launch simultaneous terror attacks against a handwritten list of 30 potential targets, including Big Ben, the London Underground, Westfield shopping centre, Heathrow Airport, courts, Shia Muslims, journalists and far-right groups.

The Charity Commission, as of 2 March 2018, has suspended supplementary educational classes with children at Ripple Road Mosque whilst it carries out its investigation, saying: "As part of the inquiry into the Essex Islamic Academy, the Commission will consider how Mr Haque was able to attempt to radicalise children, and what the trustees and others at the charity knew about this. The regulator will examine the level of supervision, due diligence and oversight the charity had over Mr Haque, and its adherence to safeguarding policies and procedures."
