= Mohammed Shamin Uddin =

British terrorist (born 1970)

Mohammed Shamin Uddin (born 22 November 1970) of Stoke Newington, London, is one of the men charged with terrorist offences in connection to the 2006 transatlantic aircraft terrorist plot in the United Kingdom, and one of the nineteen whose accounts were frozen by the Bank of England.

According to the Sunday Mirror he had been victim of a violent assault by a gang in the months preceding the arrests.

== Trial and conviction ==
Uddin was arrested with other suspects in August 2006. At his 2009 trial, he claimed to be a friend of his co-defendants, but not a terrorist.

In December 2009, Uddin was found guilty and sentenced to 15 months of imprisonment for one count of possessing materials likely to be useful to terrorism. He was found not guilty of the more serious charges of preparing for terrorism by meeting Ahmed Abdullah Ali on July 19, 2006, and of researching or permitting to research being carried out into the use and purchase of hydrogen peroxide. He was also found not guilty of possessing materials, namely a CD, which could be used for a purpose connected with the commission, preparation or instigation of an act of terrorism. However, the jury of seven women and five men unanimously convicted Uddin on the alternative count of possessing materials, namely a CD, likely to be useful to a person committing or preparing an act of terrorism. He was also sentenced to a further five years and nine months of imprisonment for possessing a firearm. He had already served most of his sentence on remand, making him eligible for early release.

== Timeline ==
- 10 August 2006 Suspect arrested by British authorities.
- 11 August 2006 Assets are frozen by the Bank of England and name published.
- 29 August 2006 Appearance at City of Westminster Magistrates' Court. Charged with conspiracy to murder and preparing acts of terrorism.
- 18 September 2006 Scheduled court appearance.
- 18 May 2007 Defendant pleads not guilty to the charges. Trial due to begin April 2008.
- 9 December 2009 Found guilty of possessing materials likely to be useful to a person committing or preparing an act of terrorism, not guilty of the more serious terrorism charges.
