= 2006 Cheetham Hill terrorism arrests =

Anti-terrorism operation in Manchester, England

The 2006 Cheetham Hill terrorism arrests was an anti-terrorism operation in the United Kingdom, in which Habib Ahmed, a taxi driver, was arrested by six policemen at his home in Cheetham Hill, Manchester on 23 August 2006 on suspicion of his involvement in a plan to attack on an individual.

He appeared in court in London on 21 September accused of collecting information about potential terrorist targets and traveling to Pakistan earlier this year for terrorism training, after the full 28-day period of arrest without charge allowed under the Terrorism Act 2006.

His wife, Mehreen Haji, was arrested on 19 September and charged with supplying £4000 to Habib Ahmed "knowing or having reasonable suspicion that it would, or might be used for the purposes of terrorism".

Police claimed the pair were members of Al-Muhajiroun, the Islamic militant group founded by radical Muslim cleric Omar Bakri Mohammed who was then serving a jail sentence for inciting terrorism.

In March 2007, Habib and Mehreen Haji appeared at the Central Criminal Court in London. Habib was accused of receiving weapons training for terrorism in Pakistan and having information likely to be useful for terrorism, while Mehreen was accused of raising money to be used for terrorism. Habib was remanded in custody for likely trial in January 2008 while Mehreen was released on bail.

Two further men, both friends of Ahmed, were arrested at 6am on 2 September from houses in Cheetham Hill as part of the same investigation, but were released without charge two weeks later. They could not explain why they had been arrested; according to the family of one of the freed men, he was a member of Al Muhajiroun when he was younger, but now had nothing to do with the group.

In September 2007, Raingzieb Ahmed, an associate of Habib Haji from Fallowfield, Manchester was deported to the UK and arrested on arrival. He had been in custody in Pakistan. He was charged with directing a terrorist organization, possessing information which would be useful to a terrorist and possessing a rucksack which contained traces of explosives.

Both Habib Ahmed and Rangzieb Ahmed were both found guilty of being members of al-Qaeda in December 2008. Mehreen Haji was cleared of two counts of arranging funding for the purposes of terrorism.

== See also ==
- Terrorism in the United Kingdom
