= 1976 Olympia bombing =

Bomb attack in West London

- Part of the Troubles
- Location: 51°29′47″N 0°12′35″W; West Kensington, London, United Kingdom
- Date: 27 March 1976 (UTC)
- Attack type: Bomb
- Deaths: 1
- Injuries: 85
- Perpetrator: Provisional Irish Republican Army (IRA)

The 1976 Olympia bombing was a bomb attack on 27 March 1976 carried out by the Provisional IRA at the Olympia exhibition centre in west London. At 4:40pm, a 2 lb (0.91 kg) bomb exploded in a litter bin at the top of an escalator inside the centre, which at the time was crowded with over 15,000 people attending the Daily Mail's Ideal Home Exhibition. 85 people were injured, including 8 children, and several people lost limbs. One casualty, 79-year-old Rachel Hyams, died from her injuries 21 days later. According to Scotland Yard, eleven of the victims were Irish.

Police said they received no coded warning from the IRA, but the Sunday Mirror in Manchester said it received a call from the Provisional IRA's “Irish Brigade” claiming responsibility, as did the BBC. The caller reportedly stated, "This is a warning to the British Government to take troops out of Northern Ireland, and more than bombs are on the way if this demand is not met". An unconfirmed report suggested that a man in his twenties placed a packaged in the litter bin just prior to the explosion.

A subsequent report on BBC's Nationwide stated that the bombing resulted in a change in security practices at the Olympia exhibition centre and may have involved a type of "explosive hardware" not previously used by the IRA in Britain.

Due to the outrage caused, the IRA temporarily halted its bombing campaign in Britain. Writing in 1986, the academic Yonah Alexander suggested that the Olympia bombing contributed to Muammar Gaddafi, at least temporarily, "reconsider[ing] his support for the IRA". In the subsequent period, IRA activity in Britain "dropped off significantly".

== See also ==
- Chronology of Provisional Irish Republican Army actions (1970–79)
- Cannon Street train bombing
- West Ham station attack
