= Mizanur Rahman (Islamic activist) =

British Islamist

Religious life
- Religion: Islam
- Denomination: Sunni
- Jurisprudence: Ahl al-Hadith
- Creed: Athari

Mohammed Mizanur Rahman (alias Abu Baraa, born 1983 in London, England) is a British Islamist activist and former follower of Omar Bakri Muhammad. He has been described as a lecturer in Islamic jurisprudence, and in 2012 has written a 244-page book titled Are Demonstrations Beneficial? – In Light of The Qur'an and Sunnah, where he opposes demonstrations. He is of Bangladeshi descent. He was convicted in 2007 of charges of solicitation to murder American troops in Afghanistan and Iraq and sentenced to four years' imprisonment. He was released from prison in late 2010 and re-arrested for terror-related offences in September 2014.

On 28 July 2016, Rahman was convicted alongside Anjem Choudary of inviting support for a proscribed organisation, ISIS. Reporting restrictions were imposed on the conviction, preventing its publication until 16 August 2016. Rahman was sentenced to 5 years and 6 months' imprisonment. Rahman was released from prison in October 2018.

== Activist ==
Mizanur Rahman is known for his advocacy of Islamist views. He participated in the Islamist demonstration outside the Danish Embassy in London in 2006 and he was later charged in relation to the protest. On 9 November 2006, he was found guilty at trial of the charge of inciting racial hatred. The jury could not reach a verdict on the charge of soliciting murder. The Crown indicated it would seek a retrial.

At his retrial in 2007, Rahman was convicted of the second charge of solicitation to murder, and sentenced to six years in prison. This sentence was reduced to four years on appeal in October 2008. During his trial, the prosecution asserted that Rahman, while not a member of any organisation, was soliciting unknown person(s) to murder other unknown person(s) from among the American occupying forces in Iraq and Afghanistan.

Since completing his four-year sentence at the end of 2010, Mizanur Rahman immediately began to revive his Islamist activities around the UK and on the Internet. He has called for the laws in Britain to be changed to the Islamic Shari'ah so that the country would become an Islamic Khilafah state.

On 5 August 2015, Rahman was charged, along with his associate Anjem Choudary, with supporting the self-declared state ISIS. He was convicted on 28 July 2016 and later sentenced to 5 years and 6 months' imprisonment. Rahman was released from prison in October 2018. Rahman has to abide by a number of conditions as he is on licence.
