= West Ham station attack =

1976 terror attack in London, England

Coordinates: 51.528°N 0.004°E

- Part of the Troubles
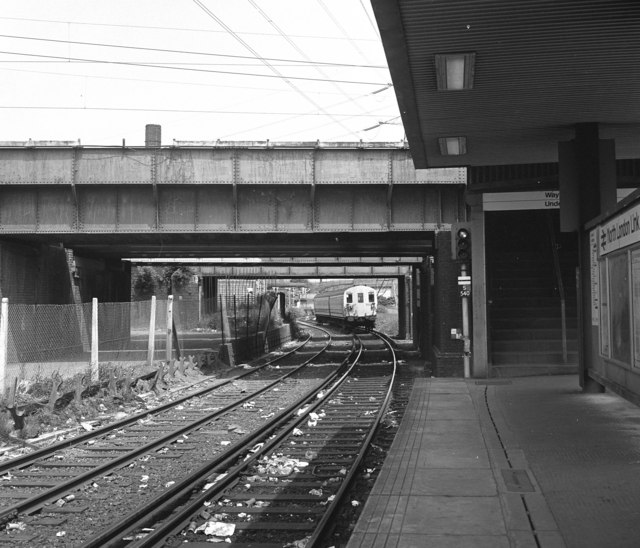
- A platform at the station in 1986
- Location: West Ham, London, United Kingdom
- Date: 15 March 1976; 4:45 pm (UTC)
- Attack type: Bombing and shooting
- Deaths: 1
- Injuries: 9
- Perpetrator: Adrian Vincent Donnelly (Provisional IRA)

The West Ham station attack was a bombing and shooting attack at West Ham station in east London on 15 March 1976. A 5 lb (2.3 kg) bomb on a Metropolitan line train exploded prematurely in the front carriage of the train, injuring seven passengers. The bomb detonated prior to reaching the City of London, where it was thought the intended target was Liverpool Street station at rush hour. Adrian Vincent Donnelly, a Provisional Irish Republican Army (IRA) member, then shot Post Office engineer Peter Chalk in the chest, and killed train driver Julius Stephen, who had attempted to catch him. Donnelly exited the station to the street and threatened people with his revolver before PC Raymond Kiff caught up with him. While shouting abuse at the police, Donnelly shot himself in the chest, but he survived and was apprehended by Kiff.

== Perpetrator ==
Adrian Vincent Donnelly, 36 at the time, was originally from Castlefin, County Donegal, in the Republic of Ireland but lived in London from 1971. He was part of an active service unit involved in planting 16 bombs. In 1977 at the Old Bailey, he was convicted of murder and attempted murder. He was sentenced to life imprisonment by Mr Justice Croom-Johnson with a minimum of 30 years. He was released after 21 years in August 1998 as one of the earliest beneficiaries of the Good Friday Agreement's prisoner release scheme. He died on 25 August 2019.

== Aftermath ==
Eleven days prior, an IRA bomb had exploded in a train at Cannon Street station. The day after the West Ham attack, a bomb on a train at Wood Green tube station exploded, injuring a man. On 17 March, a 9 lb (4.1 kg) bomb was discovered in a train at Neasden Depot. After these events, London Transport launched a security operation and assigned 1,000 plainclothed policemen on the London Underground system.

An appeal to raise money was launched for the family of the driver of the train, Julius Stephen, who left behind a widow and a family. £17,000 had been raised by August 1976.

== See also ==
- Cannon Street train bombing
- 1976 Olympia bombing
- Bombings of King's Cross and Euston stations
- Bombings of Paddington and Victoria stations
- Provisional Irish Republican Army campaign 1969–1997
