= Mohiussunnath Chowdhury =

British Bangladeshi

Mohiussunnath Chowdhury is a British Bangladeshi Islamist from Luton, Bedfordshire who was cleared of terrorist charges relating to a 2017 sword attack outside Buckingham Palace. In 2020, he was sentenced to life in prison for planning terrorist attacks.

== 2017 attack outside Buckingham Palace ==
Chowdhury used a sword to attack police officers outside Buckingham Palace on 25 August 2017 whilst he shouted Allahu Akbar. He was disarmed by two unarmed police officers. In December 2018 he was cleared of terror charges as he argued that he had only wanted to be killed by police and had no intention of harming anyone. While in high security HM Prison Belmarsh, he met jihadis including the Parsons Green train bomber. After he was released in December 2018 from prison, he started planning new attacks. Chowdhury would later brag about deceiving the jury that cleared him and claimed that the attack had really been intended as a terrorist attack while under surveillance.

== 2020 convictions ==
Chowdhury prepared for terrorist attacks by exercising and practising stabbing as well as beheading. Among prospective targets were Madame Tussauds, the Pride parade and tourist buses. He collected knives as part of the preparations. Chowdhury called deceased Yemeni-American imam Anwar al-Awlaki a "key inspiration" as well as salafi Muslim cleric Sheikh Faisal, previously based in the UK. Chowdhury posted images online from the Islamic State's official propaganda channels. He consumed Islamist propaganda and afterwards also right-wing extremist material, the latter in order to justify an attack. Chowdhury purchased a signed copy of Mohammed’s Koran – Why Muslims Kill for Islam, written by Tommy Robinson and Peter McLoughlin. Chowdhury brought it with him to the local mosque in Luton and showed it to worshippers he believed to also be jihadists. Chowdhury claimed in court that Robinson (founder of the English Defence League) demonstrated understanding of jihadi doctrine. Chowdhury and his 25-year-old sister Sneha were arrested on 3 July 2019 in Luton. According to prosecutors, the 28-year-old Chowdhury intended to kill non-Muslims while the defence barrister argued that Chowdhury was simply seeking attention but had no plans to take actions. Chowdhury was convicted at Woolwich Crown Court on 10 February 2020 for planning terrorist attacks at several locations in London and his sister was convicted for failing to disclose information about acts of terrorism. He was sentenced to life in prison, with a minimum term of 25 years.
