= Terrorism Acts =

Legislation focusing on terrorism in Britain

From 2000 to 2015, the British Parliament passed a series of Terrorism Acts that were aimed at terrorism in general, rather than specifically focused on terrorism related to Northern Ireland.

Between them, they provided a definition of terrorism that made it possible to establish a new and distinct set of police powers and procedures, beyond those related to ordinary crime, which could be applied in terrorist cases.

== List of legislation ==
The Terrorism Act 2000 (text)
- gave a broad definition of terrorism for the first time
- provided for an extended list of proscribed terrorist organisations beyond those associated with Northern Ireland.
- allowed police to detain terrorist suspects for questioning for up to 7 days.
- allowed police to stop and search any person or vehicle in designated areas without the need to suspect that person
The Anti-terrorism, Crime and Security Act 2001 (text)
- passed in the aftermath of the September 11, 2001 attacks
- contained measures that had been rejected from the 2000 Act.
- allowed Ministry of Defence Police to operate outside of military bases even for non-terrorist cases.
- Part 4 enabled foreigners to be detained as terrorist suspects indefinitely.
- required annual renewal of some provisions in recognition of the political climate
The Criminal Justice Act 2003 (text)
- doubled the period of detention of a terrorist suspect for questioning to 14 days.
- justified by the claim that forensic analysis of chemical weapons materials might not be complete in 7 days.
The Anti-terrorism, Crime and Security Act 2001 (Continuance in force of sections 21 to 23) Order 2003
- renewed Part 4 of the 2001 Act.
- voted on specifically by Parliament due to its controversial nature.
The Prevention of Terrorism Act 2005 (text)
- established the "control order" which is a form of house arrest
- was subject to extended Parliamentary dispute which lasted for over 50 hours
- passed just in time to be applied to the Part 4 terrorist suspects
The Terrorism Act 2006 (text)
- drafted in the aftermath of the 7 July 2005 London bombings
- defines the offence of "glorifying" terrorism
- revises the period of detention of terrorist suspect without charge up to 28 days
  - the government had asked for this to be 90 days, but was defeated in a vote
- justified by the claim that necessary evidence to decide charges might be encrypted on one of thousands of hard disks, and it could take this long to search them.
The Terrorism (United Nations Measures) Order 2006 (text)
- gives effect to Resolution 1373 of the United Nations Security Council (2001)
- allows the Treasury to freeze the assets of suspected terrorists
- replaces the Terrorism (United Nations Measures) Order 2001
- was ruled ultra vires and void by the Supreme Court of the United Kingdom in 2010
The Counter-Terrorism Act 2008 (text)
- allows police questioning of suspects after they have been charged
- requires convicted terrorist to notify the police of their whereabouts (similar to existing requirements for sex offenders)
- extends extra-territorial jurisdiction of courts over terrorism offences overseas
- defeat of government attempt to extend period of detention without charge to 42 days
- originally interpreted as banning all photographs of the police in public places
The Coroners and Justice Act 2009 (text)
- extends sentencing provisions in Criminal Justice Act 2003 to terrorism offences
The Terrorism (United Nations Measures) Order 2009 (text)
- gives effect to Resolution 1373 of the United Nations Security Council (2001)
- allows the Treasury to freeze the assets of suspected terrorists
- replaces the Terrorism (United Nations Measures) Order 2006
- criticised by the Supreme Court in 2010
The Terrorist Asset-Freezing (Temporary Provisions) Act 2010 (text)
- passed in response to the Supreme Court's ruling that the Terrorism (United Nations Measures) Order 2006 was void
- retrospectively legitimises the 2006 Order to give Parliament time to enact new legislation
- expires on 31 December 2010
The Justice and Security Act 2013 (text)
The Counter-Terrorism and Security Act 2015 (text)
The Counter-Terrorism and Border Security Act 2019 (text)

== Response ==
In February 2009, the Liberal Democrats published a Freedom Bill designed to repeal many of these laws (as well as others such as the Identity Cards Act 2006) aimed at reversing the "cumulative loss" of civil liberties in Britain.

In his comprehensive commentary on the anti-terrorism legislation, Professor Clive Walker of the University of Leeds comments:

The Terrorism Act 2000 represents a worthwhile attempt to fulfil the role of a modern code against terrorism, though it fails to meet the desired standards in all respects. There are aspects where rights are probably breached, and its mechanisms to ensure democratic accountability and constitutionalism are even more deficient, as discussed in the section on "Scrutiny" earlier in this chapter. It is also a sobering thought, proffered by the Home Affairs Committee, that the result is that "This country has more anti-terrorist legislation on its statute books than almost any other developed democracy." (Report on the Anti-terrorism, Crime and Security Bill 2001 (2001-02 HC 351) para.1). But at least that result initially flowed from a solemnly studied and carefully constructed legislative exercise.

Since the 1970s, an Independent Reviewer of Terrorism Legislation has reviewed the operation of the UK's principal anti-terrorism laws, reporting to the Home Secretary and to Parliament.

== See also ==
- Anti-terrorism legislation § United Kingdom
- Civil liberties in the United Kingdom
- Criticism of the war on terror
- Convention on Modern Liberty
- List of terrorist incidents in the United Kingdom
- List of people convicted under Anti-Terrorism Act in the United Kingdom
- Scotland Against Criminalising Communities
- Taking Liberties (film)
