= Timeline of the 2005 London bombings =

7 July 2005 London bombings

The following is a timeline of the 7 July 2005 London bombings and 21 July 2005 London bombings.

All times are in British Summer Time (BST or UTC+01:00).

== First explosions ==
=== 7 July 2005 ===
- 08:50: Initial reports of an incident between Liverpool Street and Aldgate tube stations, either an explosion or a collision between trains. The reports from the two stations were initially thought to relate to two separate incidents.
- 08:50: Explosion on train at Edgware Road tube station (this explosion was initially reported to have happened at 09:17).
- 08:50: Explosion on a train between King's Cross and Russell Square tube stations. Eyewitnesses report explosion appeared to come from outside the train (this explosion was initially reported to have happened at 08:56).
- 09:28: Metronet, the private consortium responsible for maintaining Tube infrastructure, says the incident was caused by some sort of power surge.
- 09:33: Reports of an incident at Edgware Road tube station. Reports that passengers on a train hit by an explosion attempted to break windows with umbrellas in order to escape.
- 09:46: British Transport Police announce there had been more explosions at King's Cross, Old Street, Moorgate, and Russell Square.
- 09:47: Explosion on number 30 bus travelling between Marble Arch and Hackney Wick at Upper Woburn Place/Tavistock Square.
- 09:49: Entire London Underground system shut down.
- 10:00: National Grid announces there had been no problem with power surges.
- 10:40: First report of fatalities, government source speaks of 20 dead.
- 11:08: Bus services suspended across central London.
- 11:10: Metropolitan Police Commissioner Sir Ian Blair confirms fears that it is a coordinated terror attack, but appeals for calm, asking people not to travel to London or make unnecessary calls to the emergency services.
- 12:05: Prime Minister Tony Blair speaks out on the incident, calling the attacks a coordinated series of 'barbaric' terrorist attacks.
- 17:30: Having flown back from Scotland, from the G8 Summit, Prime Minister Tony Blair emerges from a meeting in Downing Street and urges the public not to 'be terrorized'.
- 18:13: Deputy Assistant Police Commissioner Brian Paddick confirms 37 fatalities: two in the bus explosion at Upper Woburn Place/Tavistock Square, seven at Liverpool Street/Aldgate, seven at Edgware Road, and twenty-one in the King's Cross/Russell Square blast, as well as around seven hundred injuries, with roughly three hundred of those being transported by ambulance to London hospitals.
- 21:40: The Metropolitan Police announce that a person injured in one of the blasts has since died in hospital care.

=== 8 July 2005 ===
- 11:00: Metropolitan Police press conference. Confirmed that there are four blast sites - three on the underground and one on the bus - not six as briefly thought. Gives update on casualties: "The number of deaths stands at more than 50. There were 700 casualties, 350 of whom were treated at the scene, 350 of whom have been treated at hospital. 22 people are in a serious condition in hospital and one person has since died."^{1}
- 15:00: Queen Elizabeth II visits victims of the attacks at the Royal London Hospital, and speaks out against terrorism.
- 15:30: Police Commissioner Ian Blair and Mayor of London Ken Livingstone hold press conference. Confirm total of thirteen people killed in Tavistock Square bombing.^{2}

=== 9 July 2005 ===
- 12:30: Press conference given by Metropolitan Police Deputy Assistant Commissioner Brian Paddick, British Transport Police Deputy Chief Constable Andy Trotter and London Underground Managing Director Tim O'Toole. Confirmed that the three explosions on the Underground occurred at around 08:50.^{3}
- 19:30: After a security alert, Police evacuate Birmingham city centre.

=== 12 July 2005 ===
- 06:30: Having identified three suspects from CCTV footage, a missing person's report and documents found in the debris at each bomb site, armed police and army bomb disposal experts conduct three raids in the Beeston and Holbeck areas of Leeds and two in nearby Dewsbury, in West Yorkshire. The Metropolitan Police lead this operation, working in conjunction with West Yorkshire Police.
- 11:30: Up to 600 residents are evacuated from the area of a sixth raid, in the Burley area of Leeds. Residents are unable to return to their homes for two days following the confirmation that explosives have been found at the site.
- 13:20: A controlled explosion is carried out at the site of the raid in Burley.
- Luton Railway Station is closed as police investigate a car parked there and believed to be associated with the suspects caught on CCTV cameras. After a series of controlled explosions the car is taken away for further examination.

=== 13 July 2005 ===
- A raid by police and bomb disposal experts takes place at a house in Aylesbury in Buckinghamshire, after the identification of a fourth suspect.
- In response to public pressure, the United States Air Force bases at RAF Lakenheath and RAF Mildenhall in Suffolk lift travel bans imposed on service personnel in the wake of the bombings.

=== 3 August 2005 ===
- Piccadilly Line returns to service.

== Second explosions ==
=== 21 July 2005 ===
- 12:26: Small explosions occur at Shepherd's Bush Market, Warren Street and Oval stations.
- 13:30: A backpack is reported as exploding in east London on the Number 26 bus travelling from Waterloo station to Hackney Wick station.
- 14:30: University College Hospital is cordoned off by police; it is feared that the bomber from the Warren Street, opposite, ran into the building.
- 14:45: Whitehall, which was previously sealed off after the explosions, is reopened.
- 15:25: A major security alert again closes Whitehall
- 15:30: A man carrying a backpack is arrested by armed police outside the Ministry of Defence in Whitehall, approximately 20 metres from Downing Street
- 16:00: Sir Ian Blair now describes the situation as "firmly under control".

=== 22 July 2005 ===
- 10:00: Brazilian electrician Jean Charles de Menezes is shot dead by plain clothes police at Stockwell station, after being mistaken for Hussain Osman, one of the failed suicide bombers.

=== 27 July 2005 ===
- 04:30: Yasin Hassan Omar, suspected of the failed attack at Warren Street on 21 July 2005, along with 3 other men, is arrested in Heybarnes Road, Birmingham. He was carrying a rucksack when he was arrested and, after resisting arrest, was hit with a Taser stun gun. Later he is taken to London for questioning by the Police.

=== 29 July 2005 ===
- 11:30: Of the other three suspected attempted suicide bombers allegedly linked to the 21 July explosions, two are arrested in London. On that same day, Hussain Osman, the fourth suspect, is arrested in Rome.

=== 15 January 2007 ===
Six men appear at Woolwich Crown Court charged with offences relating to the 21 July explosions.

== Notes ==
- ^1 More details of this press conference can be found on the Metropolitan police website.
- ^2 More details of this press conference can be found on the Metropolitan police website.
- ^3 More details of this press conference can be found on the Metropolitan police website
