= Mohammed Hamid (preacher) =

British-Tanzanian man convicted for a 2005 London bombing attempt

- Born: 1957 (age 68–69); Tanzania
- Known for: Training the perpetrators of the attempted bombings in London on 21 July 2005
- Criminal charges: Three counts of training terrorists, three counts of soliciting murder, two counts of drug abuse
- Penalty: Prison indefinitely (11.5 years minimum)

Mohammed Hamid (born 1957 in Tanzania) is a British citizen and Islamist extremist convicted of training the perpetrators of the attempted bombings in London on 21 July 2005. He became radicalised and was a follower of the Jamaican extremist cleric Abdullah el-Faisal. He called himself "Osama Bin London" to an officer who was arresting him, and the nickname became popular in the press during his trial.

There has been some questioning of the validity of his conviction. His training of those involved in the attacks was reported to consist of taking young men on camping trips and to paintball games at recreation centres and conducting late-night conversations with them in the living room of his home.

== Early life ==
Born in 1957 to an Indian Muslim family then residing in Tanzania, Hamid – known as "Babou" to his family of four brothers and seven sisters – immigrated to the United Kingdom at age 5. His parents and relatives were engaged in the clothing trade in Batley, West Yorkshire. In 1960, Hamid was sent to live with his elder brother in Hackney, London. Hamid gained a reputation for petty criminality, serving multiple sentences in juvenile detention (borstal); he dropped out of school to work at a garage, but his criminal career continued, and he entered the adult prison system for robbery.

His first marriage, apparently unregistered, was to an Afro-Caribbean woman named Linda with whom he had a son and a daughter.

After separating from his common-law wife around 1990 and becoming the caretaker of his two children, Hamid became addicted to crack cocaine, which he blamed for his criminal behaviour; when asked about his addiction history at trial, he told the court that his addiction compelled him to abandon his children and sell everything to sustain his habit.

He later said that at some point during this period, he was saved from continuing his life as a drug user and ordinary criminal when he happened visit a mosque with his brother. To fix his addiction, he moved to India where he met and married his second wife, a committed Muslim. The couple settled in Hamid's council flat in Clapton, London. As the couple had four children, Hamid began coaching youth sports. Hamid became ever more radical in his religious beliefs, adopting Muslim garb, preaching at Speakers' Corner in Hyde Park, and – in 1996 – opening an Islamist bookshop which became the foundation of his radicalised activities.

== Life after radicalisation ==
The death of Muhammad Hamid's father and his new life with his second wife was a big factor in his new dedication to the Islam religion. He also was known to sometimes take drugs during this time. He opened an Islamic bookshop called al-Koran in the Clapton area of east London, and started attending rallies at Speakers' Corner after the 9/11 attacks in 2001. He devoted his life to living by his religion of Islam and wore traditional gowns. It was during this time when he began to become increasingly radical and vocal. After attending many rallies and reaching out to Muslim individuals, Hamid became a disciple of the radical preacher Abdullah el-Faisal. He eventually started to rise the ranks and assemble his own terrorist cell.

== 21 July 2005 London bombing attempt ==
On Thursday 21 July 2005, four men attempted to bomb parts of London's transportation system, but were unsuccessful. The attempted bombings occurred around midday at the Shepherd's Bush, Warren Street and Oval stations in the London Underground rapid transit system. There was also an attempt to explode a bomb on a bus in Bethnal Green. The bombs failed to explode, and no one was injured (other than one person having an asthma attack). The attempted bombers fled the scenes after their devices failed to explode, and the police operated a manhunt to find them, and shot and killed one innocent man after misidentifying him as a suspected bomber. The four attackers, Muktar Ibrahim, 27, Yassin Omar, 22, Ramzi Mohammed, 24, and Hussain Osman, 26, were arrested about a week after the bombing attempt and were found guilty of conspiracy to murder. They were each sentenced to life imprisonment, with a minimum of 40 years' imprisonment.

Mohammed Hamid and another man named Mousa Brown were arrested for their relationship with the attempted bombers. Mousa Brown was later found not guilty of all charges. However, police said that Mohammed Hamid played a crucial role in training/preparing the young men who were involved in the bombing attempt.

Hamid was found not guilty of providing weapons training at camps. No evidence was presented of him possessing or handling weapons or providing any weapon-specific training or operation-specific training. As described by the BBC, his "training" of those involved in the attacks was reported to consist of taking young men on camping trips around the UK and conducting late-night conversations with them in the living room of his home.

== Sentencing ==
After a five-month trial at the Woolwich Crown Court, Mohammed Hamid was found guilty of training terrorists in secret camps, abusing drugs, and conspiring. This case trial was the first to deal with a new offence under the Terrorism Act of 2006: attending a place for terrorist training. He was arrested, along with fourteen other men after the 2005 London bombings and for providing terrorist training. Hamid was recorded telling his terrorist recruits that he had wanted to see many atrocities before the 2012 Olympics and hailed the September 11 hijackers. The court ruled that there was evidence that Mohammed Hamid had a relationship with the four attempted bombers and did in fact train them. On 26 February 2008 Hamid was found guilty on three counts of providing terrorist training and three counts of soliciting murder. The court also ruled that he was guilty of providing terrorist training to the individuals responsible for the London bombing attempt at a remote location in the New Forest in April 2006 and at a Berkshire paint balling centre in June 2006. However, the jury at Woolwich Crown Court found him not guilty of providing weapons training. Hamid was said to have been training the attempted bombers through camping trips around the UK and paintball games at recreation centres and to have been encouraging others to murder non-believers. Mohammed Hamid was sentenced indefinitely with a minimum of seven and a half years for the protection of the public.

== Controversy ==
There has been controversy over the imprisonment of Mohammed Hamid. Some claim that Mohammed Hamid is one of the many victims of Britain's war on terror who has been sent to prison mainly for their Islamic religion. There has been debate that there has not been sufficient evidence to prove that camping and practicing paintball was enough to convict Hamid of training terrorists. Furthermore, the counts of drug abuse had little to no evidence. When asked about his act of reaching out to many young Muslims, Hamid claimed that he was trying to offer support to Muslims because they were vulnerable after the 9/11 attack. Along with other supporters, Mohammed's daughter Yasmin has launched a campaign to demand freedom for her father. She and the supporters claim that Mohammed Hamid had no relations with the London 21/7 attack and claimed Mohammed had been wrongly imprisoned. Mousa Brown had been accused and charged under the 2006 terrorism act for providing terrorist training and receiving terrorist training. The reason for these charges was for his involvement in the sport of paint balling at the locations where Mohammed trained. Later his charges were dropped but there have been claims that Mohammed Hamid was wrongly accused and imprisoned for his Muslim background and has become a victim of prejudice against Muslims.
