= 21 July 2005 London bombings trial =

July 2005 London bombings

On 15 January 2007 six men appeared at Woolwich Crown Court in connection with the attempted 21 July 2005 London bombings on London public transport.

On 9 July 2007 the jury found Muktar Said Ibrahim, Yassin Omar, Hussain Osman and Ramzi Mohammed guilty of conspiracy to murder. Each man was sentenced to life imprisonment with a minimum term of 40 years. The jury failed to agree on verdicts on two other defendants and a retrial started on 12 November 2007.

== Convicted defendants ==
- Muktar Said Ibrahim, of Stoke Newington, was convicted of attempting to detonate an explosive device on a bus in Haggerston, London and sentenced to life imprisonment with a minimum term of 40 years.
- Yasin Hassan Omar, a Somalia national, was convicted of attempting to detonate a bomb on a London Underground train near Warren Street station and was sentenced to life imprisonment with a minimum term of 40 years.
- Hussein Osman, of Stockwell, south London, was convicted of attempting to detonate a bomb on a train near Shepherd's Bush Market station and was sentenced to life imprisonment with a minimum term of 40 years.
- Ramzi Mohammed, of North Kensington, west London, was convicted of attempting to cause an explosion on a train near Oval station and was sentenced to life imprisonment with a minimum term of 40 years.

== Retrial ==
- Manfo Kwaku Asiedu was accused of involvement in the plot, and dumping his bomb in a London park after changing his mind about detonating his device. He was later sentenced to 33 years in prison.
- Adel Yahya, of Tottenham, was accused of assisting his co-defendants in planning the attacks. He later pleaded guilty to a lesser charge of collecting information likely to be useful to terrorists and was sentenced to six years, nine months - minus 546 days already served.

== The allegations ==
Nigel Sweeney QC, barrister for the prosecution alleged that the defendants were part of an extremist Muslim plot to cause deadly explosions similar to those which killed 52 people on 7 July. It was alleged that they made explosive devices at the home of Mr Omar. Muktar Said Ibrahim, Yassin Omar, Hussein Osman and Ramzi Mohammed were all accused of attempted suicide bombings and Sweeney claimed on the second day of the trial that Manfo Kwaku Asiedu "lost his nerve at the last moment".

== The defendants' claims ==
Hussein Osman claimed that the device he set off on an underground train was a hoax and was not intended to injure passengers. His claim was that it was a protest against the war in Iraq. This claim was also made by Yassin Omar towards the end of the trial.

In rejecting these claims the prosecution pointed to the apparent lack of planning for the aftermath of the explosions. The attempted bombers did not contact media organisations, and dispersed by various routes that showed no prior planning.

Mr Yahya claimed that the reason he and his co-defendants had purchased large quantities of hydrogen peroxide was to bleach wood.

== Evidence shown ==
The court was shown what appeared to be a suicide note written by Muktar Said Ibrahim.

The court was shown surveillance photographs of five of the accused on a camping trip in the lake district. It is said that the men were running up and down the hill in an "organised way".

In the second week of the trial the jury was told that almost 200 hydrogen peroxide bottles were found in bins at the block of flats where the suspects are accused of making the devices. The prosecution claims that fingerprints belonging to defendants were found on the bottles.

The jury were shown two videos which were allegedly found in homes of the defendants: footage on the tapes shows an alleged "jihad rap video" and filming of the beheading of an unidentified victim. Another tape showed what appeared to be instructions of how to make a suicide bomb vest.

An expert from the government's Forensic Explosives Laboratory told the court that particles of an explosive substance were found at the home of Ramzi Mohammed. The expert explained that the explosive could be made at home with the right knowledge.

Film showing a mixture of flour and hydrogen peroxide bubbling and smoking at Shepherd's Bush Tube station was shown in court. The prosecution alleges that this mixture was intended to explode.

CCTV footage showing Mr Asiedu at an amusement arcade on 21 July was shown to the jury.

== Key figures in the trial ==
14 barristers were involved in the trial. Some of the key people were:

- Mr Justice Fulford, a High Court Judge and one of 18 judges that preside at the International Criminal Court
- Nigel Sweeney QC, Main barrister for the prosecution
- George Carter-Stephenson QC, barrister representing Muktar Said Ibrahim
- Stephen Kamlish QC, barrister for Manfu Kwaku Asiedu
- Anthony Jennings QC, barrister for Hussein Osman
- Peter Carter QC, barrister For Yassin Omar
- Stephen Williamson QC, barrister for Ramzi Mohammed
- Peter Thornton QC, barrister for Adel Yahya
