= Girma =

Girma (Ge'ez: ግርማ) is a male name of Ethiopian and Eritrean origin that may refer to:

- Girma Ashenafi (born 1982), Ethiopian footballer
- Girma Asmerom, Eritrean diplomat
- Girma Bekele Gebre (born 1992), Ethiopian runner
- Girma Bèyènè, Ethiopian composer and musician
- Girma Berhanu (born 1960), Ethiopian runner
- Girma Tolla (born 1975), Ethiopian long-distance runner
- Girma Wolde-Giorgis (born 1924), President of Ethiopia (2001–2013)
- Girma Yifrashewa (born 1967), Ethiopian pianist and composer
- Girma Yohannis Iyasu (born 1961), Iyasuist claimant to the throne of Ethiopia
- Adane Girma (born 1985), Ethiopian footballer
- Alula Girma (born 1993), Ethiopian footballer
- Berhanu Girma (born 1986), Ethiopian marathon runner
- Chaltu Girma Meshesha (born 1985), birth name of Ethiopian-born long-distance runner for Turkey Sultan Haydar
- Haben Girma (born 1988), deafblind lawyer
- Lamecha Girma (born 2000), Ethiopian runner
- Muluemebet Girma (born 1984), from Stockwell, London, was the third person charged over the 21 July 2005 London bombings
- Nahu Senay Girma, Ethiopian women's rights campaigner
- Naomi Girma (born 2000), American soccer player
- Yeshshiemebet Girma (born 1977), the second person charged over the 21 July 2005 London bombings

== See also ==
- Girmay
