= O'Farrell and Others v Governor of Portlaoise Prison =

Irish Supreme Court case

O'Farrell v Governor of Portlaoise Prison
- Coat of arms of Ireland
- Court: Supreme Court of Ireland
- Full case name: O'Farrell & ors v Governor of Portlaoise Prison
- Decided: 12 July 2016
- Citation: https://www.bailii.org/ie/cases/IESC/2016/S37.html

Case history
- Appealed from: The High Court
- Appealed to: The Supreme Court

Court membership
- Judges sitting: O'Donnell J, Clarke J, Denham J, Laffoy J, MacMenamin J, O'Malley J

Case opinions
- The appellant and two others were found guilty of plotting to commit terrorist crimes and sentenced to 30 years in prison. In 2005, they asked for a transfer under the Transfer of Sentence Persons Act 1995 to finish their sentences in Ireland. The Supreme Court concluded that the appellant was entitled to be released once he served his custodial sentence. Seven judges reviewed an appeal from the High Court, which agreed that the warrants were defective due to the Sweeney decision. MacMenamin J found that the way the respondents were detained in Ireland was 'fundamentally defective', so the warrants were void from the start.
- Decision by: Mc Kechnie J.

Keywords
- habeas corpus

O'Farrell and Others v Governor of Portlaoise Prison, [2016] IESC 37, [2016] 3 IR 619 is a reported Irish Supreme Court decision. The Court, split four-three dismissed an appeal from the State over the release of three dissident prisoners (political prisoners). According to Section 9 of the Transfer of Sentenced Persons Act 1995, the Court ruled that it did not have the right to increase the prison sentences of three people who had been sent from England to Ireland to finish their sentences. This case is important as it showed a flaw in the way the Irish prison system carried out prison sentences handed down by courts in other countries. This led to the early release of a number of prisoners.

== Background ==
After a failed attempt to get the Iraqi Secret Service to help the Real Irish Republican Army, the appellant and two others were found guilty of plotting to commit a number of terrorist crimes. The accused went to Slovakia thinking that they would meet with Iraqi arms dealers to talk about buying weapons and explosives. It turned out that the meeting was actually a 'sting operation' set up by members of the British Secret Service. The people who were accused were caught and sent back to the UK, where they pleaded guilty in Woolwich Crown Court. They were given a sentence of 30 years in prison, which started when they were caught in 2001. In July 2015, the Court of Appeal of England and Wales reduced their sentences to 28 years.

In August 2005, the appellant and the co-accused(s) asked for a transfer under the Transfer of Sentenced Persons Act 1995 so that they could finish their sentences in Ireland. The State had to do what was required by the Council of Europe Convention on the Transfer of Sentenced Persons. This Act made sure that happened. This is a mostly humanitarian measure that is meant to help prisoners who are serving jail time in a foreign country get back on their feet by letting them finish their sentences in their own country. A person from the Department of Justice wrote to the prisoners and told them that if they took advantage of the transfer, they would have to stay in jail longer. This was because the way sentences are handed down in the two countries are different. At the time, the Criminal Justice Act said that prisoners with sentences longer than a year had to spend two-thirds of their time in jail and then do community service. Under the terms of the English sentence, the prisoners would have been able to get out after 18 years and 8 months. Under the Irish system, a 25% reduction is the most that can be given. In a letter sent back to the Minister of Justice, the prisoners agreed to that condition due to the transfer. In July 2006, the High Court was asked for warrants so that each prisoner could be relocated to Portlaoise Prison.

While the transfers were pending, the sentencing differences between the two jurisdictions in the context of the Transfer of Persons Act 1995 was considered by the Supreme Court in Vincent Sweeney v Governor of Loughlan House Open Centre and Others. In this particular case the appellant had been sentenced to sixteen years imprisonment by an English Court, half of which was to be served in custody with the remaining half on licence. The appellant who had transferred from the United Kingdom to Ireland under the Transfer of Persons, contested his continued detention after his eight years in custody had been served. The Supreme Court came to the conclusion that since there was no facility in Ireland for the appellant to serve his supervised release on licence, he was entitled to be released once he served his custodial sentence.

In Vincent Sweeney v. Governor of Loughlan House Open Centre and Others, the Supreme Court looked at how the Transfer of Persons Act 1995 affected the differences in sentencing between the two places. In this case, the appellant was given a sentence of sixteen years in prison by an English court. Half of that time was to be served in prison, and the other half was to be served on parole. The appellant, who had moved from the UK to Ireland under the Transfer of Persons Act, argued against his continued detention after his eight years in jail had passed. The Supreme Court decided that since the appellant couldn't serve his supervised release on license in Ireland because there wasn't a place for him to do so, he was entitled to be freed once he finished his prison sentence.

High Court

As a result of the Sweeney decision, O'Farrell filed a habeas corpus petition with the High Court. He said that the warrant justifying his sentence was flawed because it didn't say that he was eligible for release after 18 years, which was part of the original sentence. Article 40.4 of the Constitution says that the High Court has to "look into" complaints from prisoners that they were held illegally. In September 2014, Hogan J. ordered that the prisoners be set free because the warrants were flawed because they "incorrectly" recorded the sentence was for 28 years instead of 18 years and 8 months.

== Holding of the Supreme Court ==
Seven judges reviewed appeal from the High Court, who all agreed that the warrants were defective, because of the Sweeney decision. The question was whether the warrants could be altered to demonstrate that the sentences under Irish law were for just over 18 years and would start on the day they were arrested in 2001.

Concurring

The State's appeal was dismissed by the majority of the judges. Laffoy J, MacMenamin J, and O'Malley J all agreed that the High Court could only use section 9 of the 1995 Act to change one or two small parts of the warrants, not the length of the original sentences. Since the sentences given by the English Court were for 28 years and could be overturned after 16 years, the Irish Court did not have the capacity to extend them. MacMenamin J came to the decision that the way the respondents were detained in Ireland was 'fundamentally defective,' so the warrants were void from the start.

Laffoy J. agreed with the High Court's reasoning and found that the Minister for Justice had tried to add new conditions to the sentences, which should have happened during the adaptation process before the transfer.

Using the trial judge's method, he was under pressure to come to the decision that the changes requested by the Minister, which completely eliminate the "release on licence in the community" portion of the sentence and change, and change, the legal nature and length of the state that handed down the sentence. This required the creation of an adoption order in 2006 and cannot be handled by an order to change the sentence under Section 9.

Dissenting

In a decision that O'Donnell J, Clarke J, and Denham CJ wrote together, they said that they would have let the State's appeal go through. O'Donnell J. and Clarke J. looked at the Convention's main humanitarian goal, which was to make it easier for prisoners serving prison sentences in other countries to go back to their home countries to be near their relatives. Even though they agreed that the warrants were wrong, they also said that the sentencing court had a valid order to hold the prisoners. It was also said that s. 9 of the 1995 Act allows for changes so that the goals of the Convention can be met. It was decided that a change to the warrant that made the jail part of the English Sentence work but took away the license part would have been permissible.

== Subsequent developments ==
In May 2015, the Irish Examiner reported that a number of prisoners who had been sent from Britain to Ireland under the Transfer of Sentenced Persons Act 1995 had been released on similar terms In 2016, the Minister for Justice put out a statement saying that no more transfer requests could be made under this law until it was clearer. This meant that no more requests could be made, no matter where the prisoner was being held, until the law was made clearer. As of May 2018, transfer requests for countries have been accepted again, and the Chief State Solicitors Office is now working on them. Requests to move from the UK are still on hold because no law has been passed to make it easier to adapt these sentences into Irish law.
