= 21 July 2005 London attempted bombings =

Attempted terrorist attacks in London

Coordinates: 51°31′42″N 0°4′33″W

- 21 July 2005 London attempted bombings (Greater London) 21 July 2005 London attempted bombings (the United Kingdom)
- Location: Aboard London Underground trains and a bus in Haggerston
- Date: 21 July 2005; 12:26–13:30 (BST)
- Target: General public
- Attack type: Terrorism, attempted bombings
- Weapon: Hydrogen peroxide bombs
- Deaths: 1 (Jean Charles de Menezes)
- Injuries: 1 (asthma attack)
- Perpetrators: Muktar Said Ibrahim; Yasin Hassan Omar; Ramzi Mohammed; Hussain Osman; Manfo Kwaku Asiedu; Adel Yahya
- Motive: Islamic terrorism as a follow-up to the 7/7 bombings

On 21 July 2005, four attempted bomb attacks by four Islamist extremists disrupted part of London's public transport system as a follow-up attack to the 7 July 2005 London bombings two weeks earlier. The explosions occurred around midday at Shepherd's Bush, Warren Street and Oval stations on the London Underground, and on London Buses route 26 in Haggerston. A fifth bomber dumped his device without attempting to set it off.

Connecting lines and stations were closed and evacuated. Metropolitan Police later said the intention of the attack was to cause large-scale loss of life, but only the detonators of the bombs exploded, probably causing the popping sounds reported by witnesses; a person having a minor asthma attack was the only reported injury. The suspects fled the scenes after their bombs failed to explode.

The next day, Friday, 22 July 2005, CCTV images of four suspects wanted in connection with the bombings were released. Two of the men shown in these images were identified by police on Monday, 25 July 2005 as Muktar Said Ibrahim and Yasin Hassan Omar. The resulting manhunt was described by the Metropolitan Police commissioner Sir Ian Blair as "the greatest operational challenge ever faced" by the Met. During the manhunt, police misidentified a Brazilian citizen, Jean Charles de Menezes, as one of the suspected bombers and shot him dead.

By 29 July 2005, police had arrested all four of the main suspects. Yasin Hassan Omar was arrested by police on 27 July, in Birmingham. On 29 July, two more suspects were arrested in London. A fourth suspect, Hussain Osman, was arrested in Rome and later extradited to the UK. Police also arrested numerous other people in the course of their investigations.

On 9 July 2007, four defendants, Muktar Saáid Ibrahim (29), Yasin Hassan Omar (26), Ramzi Mohammed (25) and Hussain Osman (28), were found guilty of conspiracy to murder. Each was sentenced to life imprisonment, with a minimum of 40 years' imprisonment.

== Explosions ==
=== Explosions on the Underground ===
- 12:26 BST – An explosion occurred on a train at Shepherd's Bush Market tube station on the Hammersmith & City line in West London.
- 12:30 – An explosion occurred on a train at Oval Underground station on the Northern line.
- 12:45 – An explosion occurred on a Victoria line train at Warren Street Underground station (through which the Northern line also runs).

In each case, only the detonator caps fired and the bombs themselves did not go off; this may have been due to the low quality hydrogen peroxide used in the devices, which had been obtained from a large number of easily available sources. The explosions were small—only about as powerful as a large firework—and no injuries were reported, although a person who suffered an asthma attack was counted as the incident's sole injury.

In response to the blasts, the stations were all evacuated and other stations including Archway in North London, Moorgate, St Paul's in the City and Green Park in the West End were also cleared. Many parts of the London Underground system including the Victoria line, Northern line, Hammersmith and City Line, Bakerloo line and Piccadilly line were suspended.

Some eyewitnesses reported a "strange smell", described by some as resembling burning rubber, emanating from the Underground stations. Some early reports seem to be suggesting that the smell preceded the bang by several minutes. It appears that people on a train smelt a strange odour, and realised something was wrong. They ran from one carriage to another while the train was still moving and then heard an explosion behind them.

Eyewitnesses at the scenes reported seeing men running away from the site of the explosions, and there were unconfirmed suggestions that one of the bombers had been injured. In the Oval underground carriage, as passengers fled to the other side of the carriage, an off-duty fireman named Angus Campbell stayed behind to reason with Mohammed, and shouted for other bystanders to apprehend him when he made his escape.

=== Explosion on a double-decker bus ===
- 13:30 – A small explosion occurred in Haggerston on the Number 26 bus travelling from Waterloo to Hackney Wick, on the London Borough of Hackney side of Hackney Road. There were no fatalities in the explosion.

The vehicle involved was a Dennis Trident 2 operated by Stagecoach London.

=== Early suspicion of chemical attacks ===
It was reported that one of the 7 July suspects, Jamal (Germaine) Lindsay, had bought £900 worth of perfumes immediately before the bombings, possibly to disguise the acrid smell of the decomposing explosives. Some witnesses reported seeing a white powder: TATP is a white crystalline powder. An eyewitness mentioned that as one of the explosions occurred there was a "smell of vinegar" which could be attributed to combustion by-products of the explosive TATP.

== Subsequent incidents ==
=== University College Hospital (UCH) ===
University College Hospital, near Warren Street, was cordoned off at 14:30, reportedly by armed police. Eyewitnesses reported seeing three armed police officers entering the building.

Both CNN and The Times reported that the armed police at University College Hospital were pursuing a suspected bomber who fled into the building following a chase on foot down Tottenham Court Road. Witnesses reported shots being fired as the man led police on the chase from Warren Street Underground station. Police say the "gunshots" may have actually been detonators going off.

An internal memo at the hospital told employees to look for a tall man with wires protruding from his clothing. The memo reportedly described the suspect as "a black male, possibly of Asian origin, about 6 ft 2 in (188 cm) tall, wearing a blue top with wires protruding from the rear of the top." The BBC spoke to Prof Jim Ryan of UCH, who said he had not seen any such memo and dismissed the idea as "absolute rumour." A BBC reporter, however, said that he had been given a copy of an email sent to staff asking them to look for the suspect.

Later in the afternoon police said they had ended their armed operation at the hospital, but returned 30 minutes later. A Scotland Yard spokesman told the BBC: "We've got our armed deployment at UCH but we can't discuss it further." There were conflicting reports on whether the redeployment was related to the bombings. CNN reported that sources told them police had returned to conduct a manhunt inside the building, but police said the deployment was unrelated to the explosions.

=== The first arrests ===
At 15:30, around two hours after the explosions, a major security alert occurred in Whitehall outside the Ministry of Defence during which a man was arrested by armed police. The man was ordered to lie on the pavement before being handcuffed and arrested, about 20 m (66 ft) from Downing Street. He was also ordered to open his jacket and shirt before being taken by the police, presumably to allow police to see any hidden explosives that may have been on his person. He did not appear to be carrying any bags, and did not seem to be wearing a belt, although it was very hard for the reporter to see. The BBC reported (and television coverage showed) that he was wearing a small black backpack which the police had him remove before undoing his shirt.

Two other people were also arrested: one in the Whitehall area, and one near Tottenham Court Road, according to the BBC. But all were later released without any charges being brought against them.

According to Metropolitan Police Commissioner Sir Ian Blair, the two arrests in Whitehall were "totally unconnected" to the earlier explosions.

=== Other security alerts ===
A security alert was declared, mid-afternoon, at St Albans railway station, north of London. The station was closed and the surrounding area evacuated following the discovery of an unattended backpack. In Putney, a number 37 bus was also cordoned off after a suspect package was discovered. These incidents are both believed to be bomb scares.

=== 22 July ===
==== Death of Jean Charles de Menezes ====
Police shot and killed a Brazilian man, Jean Charles de Menezes, at Stockwell Underground station shortly after 10:00 on 22 July. After an officer, who had broken away from proper surveillance to urinate and failed to take images of de Menezes to aid in identification, alerted other officers that he believed de Menezes was perhaps one of two different suspects in the attacks of the previous day, other officers clandestinely followed. De Menezes was, in fact, an electrician using normal Transport for London trains to go and fix a client's broken fire alarm in Kilburn. The pursuing officers apparently believed de Menezes, who was claimed to be wearing a heavy jacket – later shown to be an ordinary denim jacket – was a possible suicide bomber.

The day they killed him, Police Commissioner Sir Ian Blair said that de Menezes "was challenged and refused to obey police instructions", which a public inquiry later found to be an untruth propagated by the police throughout an extended period of media briefings. The Met Police repeated the falsehoods that de Menezes was dressed suspiciously and ignored instructions even after they confirmed, on 23 July, that he was not related to the bombing incidents and that "For somebody to lose their life in such circumstances is a tragedy and one that the Metropolitan Police Service regrets." Services on the Victoria line between Victoria and Brixton and on the Northern line between Kennington and Morden were briefly suspended on the day of the killing, at the request of the police.

==== Security alerts ====
Sky and BBC News reported that the East London Mosque on Whitechapel Road in Whitechapel had been surrounded by armed police and that residents were told to stay indoors. The mosque was evacuated at about 10:30 and searched. However, police confirmed that it was a bomb scare and the all-clear was given after just over an hour.

Security alerts continued into the weekend, with major disruption to London's transport system.

=== 23 July ===
==== A fifth bomb ====
On 23 July, a suspect package was found in bushes in Little Wormwood Scrubs, just north of White City and Shepherd's Bush. It was subjected to a controlled explosion and appears to have been a further bomb made to the same design as the others used on 21 July. This led to speculation that a fifth bomber might be at large. Scotland Yard stated that they were looking for more than just the four men caught on CCTV, and by 29 July five suspected bombers had been arrested.

Like other devices used on 21 July, the device was packed into a 6.25-litre (1.37-imperial-gallon; 1.65-US-gallon) clear plastic food container with a white lid, manufactured by Delta of India, sold in about 100 outlets across the UK. The police made an appeal to retailers who may have sold five or more in the time period.

== Investigation ==
It was immediately apparent that the explosions were the result of an attempted terrorist attack, but it was initially unclear whether the explosions were a serious attempt to repeat 7 July bombings or were merely a symbolic attack or hoax intended to cause panic rather than mass casualties. The explosives used by the bombers consisted of chapatti flour powder mixed with concentrated liquid hydrogen peroxide, to be detonated by a charge of TATP. This was a similar explosive mixture to that used by the bombers in the 7/7 bombings two weeks earlier, which had used concentrated hydrogen peroxide and pepper. It was later confirmed that substantial improvised explosive devices capable of causing significant numbers of casualties had in fact been involved, but had failed to explode. The explosions were caused by detonators which failed to detonate the main explosive charge. Police later disclosed that some of the devices used had survived the explosions and were available for forensic investigation.

=== In relation to the 7 July bombings ===
Both sets of bombings involved three Underground trains and a bus; in both cases, rucksacks were involved; and in both cases, the three Underground explosions were roughly simultaneous while the bus explosion was an hour later. It was later reported that three of the four devices were of similar size and weight to those used on 7 July, with the fourth being housed in a smaller plastic box; all were said to have used the same type of explosive.

=== Claims of responsibility ===
Late Thursday night, a group calling itself the Abu Hafs al-Masri Brigade, after a nickname for one of Osama bin Laden's lieutenants who was killed in a 2001 airstrike in Afghanistan, posted a statement claiming responsibility for the attempted bombings. The group vowed that the terror would continue as long as Europe's soldiers were in Iraq. The group also claimed responsibility for the 7 July 2005 London bombings, the 2004 Madrid train bombings, and the 2003 North America blackout. Experts doubt the legitimacy of the group, as security experts have discredited the claims of the Madrid attack, and investigators have ruled out sabotage as a cause of the blackout. In its statement, the group cited Rome, Amsterdam and Copenhagen as future targets. However, the group has made threats in the past that it has failed to carry out. The group has also previously falsely claimed responsibility for events that were the result of technical problems, such as the 2003 London blackout and Northeast Blackout of 2003.

=== Suspects and later arrests ===
Several individuals were reported to have been arrested on 22 July in connection with the bombings, including one man in Stockwell—the area where the shooting incident took place—and another man at Snow Hill railway station in the city of Birmingham who was soon released without charge. The former may be among the individuals seen running away from the scenes of the incidents who were caught on CCTV footage. Police released images of people they wished to question with regards to the attempted bombings captured from London transport CCTV cameras.

On 25 July, two of the suspects were named by police as Yasin Hassan Omar and Muktar Said Ibrahim (also known as Muktar Mohammed Said). Yasin Hassan Omar was suspected of trying to detonate the device at Warren Street tube station and Muktar Said Ibrahim of trying to detonate the device on the bus. The Home Office stated that both men have legally been residents for at least ten years.

On Wednesday 27 July, police arrested Omar in Birmingham. A suspect package was found in the course of his arrest. Three further arrests were also made in Birmingham. This raid was raised because the caretaker of the area found around ten large bottles of hair dye, which can be used in explosives, and he was suspicious so called a low level police contact.

Major police raids occurred in west London on 29 July. It has been reported that a further two of the pictured suspects, Muktar Said Ibrahim and Ramzi Mohammed, were arrested in the course of these raids, while the Shepherd's Bush suspect – Hussain Osman – was arrested in Rome that day. The raids were supported by United Kingdom Special Forces. The men arrested in London were apparently the suspects wanted in connection with the Oval tube and bus bombing attempts, and the man arrested in Rome is the Shepherd's Bush suspect. A European Arrest Warrant for Hussain Osman was issued by the Metropolitan Police, and he was extradited to the UK where he was charged on 8 December 2005. In addition the suspected fifth bomber Whabi Mohammad, 22, the brother of Ramzi Mohammad, was also under arrest by 28 July.

=== House raids ===
In the afternoon of 22 July, house raids were conducted on Harrow Road in West London (approximately a mile from Paddington railway station). The road was cordoned off by armed police and some eyewitnesses reported seeing a bomb-disabling robot.

On 25 July, police announced that they had raided a property in north London. The property was a council flat in Curtis House, Ladderswood Way, New Southgate in which Yasin Hassan Omar had been living since 1999. No arrests were made in the raid although two men were arrested in the area. Later reports suggested that explosives may have been found at the raided address. The BBC issued a summary of raids.

Major raids were carried out by the police on 29 July in the Notting Hill and North Kensington areas of West London. Three people were arrested during these raids, including two of the suspects who were thought to have carried out the failed bombing attempt.

=== Seized vehicles ===
On 26 July, it was reported that police had seized a vehicle abandoned in East Finchley, north London. The BBC reported that the vehicle was a white VW Golf which was not owned by any of the suspects but which was thought to have been used by them.

=== Charges ===
On 7 August 2005, Yasin Hassan Omar, Muktar Said Ibrahim, and Ramzi Mohammed were charged with attempting to murder passengers and being in possession of an explosive substance. Along with a fourth man, Manfo Kwaku Asiedu, they were also charged with conspiring to murder passengers. (Note: See the article on Hussain Osman for the charges laid against him on 8 December 2005)

==== Individuals charged or held by police ====
As of 8 August 2005, the following people had been charged in relation to 21 July or 7 July bombing attempts:

- Charged with association with the aim of international terrorism and with possessing false documents in Italy:
  - Hussain Osman, found guilty at Woolwich Crown Court of conspiracy to murder and sentenced to life imprisonment, with a minimum of 40 years in prison.
- Charged with association with the aim of international terrorism:
  - Yasin Hassan Omar, arrested 27 July in Birmingham, charged 7 August, found guilty of conspiracy to murder 9 July 2007.
  - Ramzi Mohammed, charged 7 August, found guilty of conspiracy to murder 9 July 2007.
  - Muktar Said Ibrahim, charged 7 August, found guilty of conspiracy to murder 9 July 2007.
- Charged with conspiracy to murder and conspiracy to cause explosions likely to endanger life or cause serious injury:
  - Manfo Kwaku Asiedu, charged 7 August, remanded in custody until 14 November.
- Charged with failing to disclose information that may help police investigating an act of terrorism:
  - Siraj Yassin Abdullah Ali, remanded in custody until 11 August.
  - Shadi Sami Abdel Gadir, remanded in custody until 11 August.
  - Omar Nagmeloin Almagboul, remanded in custody until 11 August.
  - Mohamed Kabashi, remanded in custody until 11 August.
  - Yeshshiemebet Girma, remanded in custody until 11 August.
  - Muluemebet Girma, remanded in custody until 11 August.
- Charged with failing to disclose information about suspected Shepherd's Bush bomber Hussain Osman:
  - Ismael Abdurahman, remanded in custody until 11 August.
- Charged with assisting a person or persons in evading arrest:
  - Asias Girma, remanded in custody until 11 August.
  - Whabi Mohammed, remanded in custody until 11 August.

As of 8 August, the following individuals were being held by police in relation to 21 July or 7 July bombing attempts:

- One of two men, arrested 1 August in raids on addresses in Clapham and Stockwell, South London
- A woman, arrested 3 August in Stockwell

As of 8 August, the following individuals had been released from custody after being held by police in relation to 21 July or 7 July bombing attempts:

- Two men, arrested 22 July in Stockwell, South London
- A man, arrested 23 July in Tulse Hill, South London
- A man, arrested 24 July near Curtis House, in New Southgate in North London and rearrested on 6 August, bailed to return in September
- A man, arrested 25 July, again near Curtis House
- three men, arrested 27 July in Washwood Heath, Birmingham
- one woman, arrested 27 July in Stockwell on suspicion of harbouring offenders, bailed to return in September
- nine people, arrested 28 July in Tooting, South London
- three people, arrested 29 July in Notting Hill and North Kensington
- two women, arrested 29 July in Liverpool Street station
- three men and a woman, arrested 31 July in Brighton
- a man arrested 2 August in Finchley, north London

=== Trial ===
Muktar Said Ibrahim, Manfo Kwaku Asiedu, Hussein Osman, Yasin Hassan Omar, Ramzi Mohammed and Adel Yahya began trial in relation to the 21 July attacks at Woolwich Crown Court on 15 January 2007. The case was anticipated to last for 'up to four months,' but the jury retired to consider the verdict on 28 June 5½ months later.

On 9 July 2007, the jury found Muktar Said Ibrahim, Yasin Hassan Omar, Ramzi Mohammed, and Hussain Osman guilty of conspiracy to murder. In November 2007, Manfo Kwaku Asiedu admitted conspiracy to cause explosions while a charge of conspiracy to murder was dropped. Adel Yahya pleaded guilty to a lesser charge.

On 26 February 2008, a Tanzanian-born Muslim man who dubbed himself "Osama bin London" was found guilty of encouraging his followers to murder non-believers and of running violent Islamist training camps in Britain. Mohammed Hamid, 50, who came to England when he was five, was convicted along with three followers – Kibley da Costa, 25, Mohammed al-Figari, 45, and Kader Ahmed, 20 – whom the jury found guilty of attending the training camps. A fifth suspect, Atilla Ahmet, 43, who once boasted of being Al Qaeda's top figure in Europe, admitted three charges of soliciting murder at the start of the complex four-month trial at Woolwich Crown Court. The trial was closely watched in Britain as Hamid was accused of providing the inspiration for the men who tried to carry out suicide bombings on London's transport system on 21 July 2005.

=== Appeals ===
In April 2008, the Court of Appeal judges dismissed a challenge by Ibrahim, Omar, Mohammed and Osman to their convictions. In December 2014 an appeal to the European Court of Human Rights lodged in 2008 by Ibrahim, Omar and Mohammed claiming that their rights were breached in the 'safety interviews' after their arrests was rejected.

=== Sentences ===
- Muktar Said Ibrahim, Ramzi Mohammed, Hussain Osman, Yasin Hassan Omar: life sentences in prison, to serve a minimum of 40 years.
- Manfo Kwaku Asiedu: 33 years in prison.
- Adel Yahya: Six years nine months in prison.
- Wahbi Mohammed, Abdul Sherif, Siraj Ali, Muhedin Ali, Ismail Abdurahman: Between seven and 17 years in prison
- Yeshi Girma (Hussain Osman's wife): 15 years in prison
- Esayas Girma (Yeshi's brother) and Mulu Girma (Yeshi's sister): 10 years in prison
- Mohamed Kabashi (Mulu's boyfriend): 10 years in prison
- Fardosa Abdullahi (Yasin Hassan Omar's fiancée): three years in prison.

=== Objectives and Iraq connection ===
During the initial investigation in Rome, Hussain said he was motivated to participate in the attacks after viewing videos of war-torn Iraq. "I am against war," Osman said "I've marched in peace rallies and nobody listened to me. I never thought of killing people." He claimed that the bombs were never meant to detonate or kill anybody, only to draw attention to the Iraq war.

Other news sources reported that the bombers watched videos of women and children killed in Iraq by British and American troops before embarking on their mission. Some quoted him as saying "Muktar showed us some DVDs with images of the war in Iraq, especially women and children killed by American and British soldiers," Hussain said, adding that they were not to talk about these videos with others.

"There was a feeling of hatred and conviction that it was necessary to give signal—to do something." Hussain denied links with either the Al-Qaeda or the 7 July bombers.

== Biographies ==
=== Manfo Kwaku Asiedu ===
Manfo Kwaku Asiedu (Arabic: مانفو كواكو أسيدو) is a Ghanaian-born man who was convicted for his role in the bombings. Some sources suggest his real name is George Nanak Marquaye, as that was the name on the passport which he used when entering the country, or Sumaila Abubakari.

He was raised in Ghana and educated to the equivalent of A-level standard. He entered Britain on a flight from Ghana in late 2003.

He was charged on 7 August 2005, with conspiracy to murder and conspiring to cause an explosion. After an unexploded bomb was found in Little Wormwood Scrubs park, Asiedu turned himself in to the police. During the trial, he testified against the other five defendants. The jury was unable to reach a verdict on the charge of conspiracy to murder, but rather than face a retrial, Asiedu agreed to plead guilty on the lesser charge of conspiracy to cause an explosion. On 20 November 2007, he was sentenced to jail for 33 years and the judge also recommended that Asiedu be deported back to Ghana upon release.

At 32, Asiedu was the oldest of those suspected, and was said to have no permanent address at the time of the alleged crime.

There was initial confusion that Manfo was the son of Ghana's Deputy Inspector-General of Police, K.K. Asiedu, but his son was later tracked down and absolved.

He is held at Belmarsh prison, and his first court appearance was 8 August 2005. He speaks the Twi language of Ghana and requires an interpreter in court.

== Response and advice ==
=== Immediate response ===
Prime Minister Tony Blair, Home Secretary Charles Clarke, and other ministers and key officials from government and the emergency services attended a meeting in COBR. Blair interrupted a meeting with Prime Minister of Australia John Howard to attend a COBR meeting, although he and Howard later gave a joint news conference in response to the attacks on both the London Underground and Haggerston (Howard was also in Washington, D.C., at the time of the 11 September 2001 attacks.) Whitehall, the main artery serving the governmental district, was initially sealed off and evacuated, but was reopened at 14:45. It was subsequently closed again around 15:25 following an arrest and a bomb scare, both of which were fairly quickly resolved.

Sir Ian Blair, the Met police chief, described the incident as "serious" but said that there were "fewer injuries", caused by bombs that appeared to be "much smaller than those used on 7 July".

The police advised people to stay where they were and not travel unless absolutely necessary. However, people living within a 300-metre radius of the bomb sites were evacuated, due to worries about chemical agents being used. By about 16:00, however, Sir Ian Blair described the situation as "firmly under control" and urged London "to get ... moving again".

According to the Evening Standard, stranded commuters and evacuated locals in Shepherd's Bush held an impromptu street party during the evening of 21 July, in the vicinity of the crime scene, which lasted until the early morning. Music was provided by a peace activism group, and several photographs of this appeared in London's local press the following day.

=== International reaction ===
Australian Prime Minister John Howard condemned the attack, and stated that Australia stood by Britain and that people should "beware the minds of terrorists" during a press conference with Tony Blair.

The United States Department of State informed President George W. Bush of the attacks and The Pentagon raised its security level in response to the incidents in London. In addition, New York City Police Commissioner, Raymond Kelly announced that they would begin randomly searching backpacks on the New York City Subway system, though they have said that this move had been under consideration before the events in London.

China Foreign Ministry spokesman Liu Jianchao has said that "China's thoughts are with the peoples of London" by this tragedy and once again "condemned" any terrorist attacks targeted at civilians.

== See also ==
- 29 June 2007 attempted car bombings
- Murder of Lee Rigby
- Parsons Green bombing
