= Ramzi Mohammed =

Member of al-Qaeda

- Born: 18 August 1981 (age 45); Somalia
- Arrested: 27 July 2005; Heybarnes Road, Small Heath, Birmingham; West Midlands Police
- Citizenship: British, Somali
- Charge: Convicted for his role in the attempted 21 July attacks on London's public transport system.
- Penalty: Found guilty at Woolwich Crown Court of conspiracy to murder and sentenced to life imprisonment, with a minimum of forty years before being considered for release.
- Status: Incarcerated
- Children: Two sons

Ramzi Mohammed (Arabic: رمزي محمد) (born 18 August 1981) is a Somali national convicted of involvement in the attempted London bombing of 21 July 2005.

Ramzi is currently serving a minimum of 40 years for conspiracy to murder on the Oval Underground station train. He was arrested sharing an apartment with Muktar Said Ibrahim on 29 July 2005, amid allegations that he was the so-called 'bus bomber'. During the arrest, which reportedly culminated in Ramzi and Ibrahim standing near-naked on their balcony to avoid tear gas that police had used,

Later, it was discovered that Ramzi had tried to have the local imam at Muslim Cultural Heritage Centre in North Kensington removed over religious disagreements. Together with his brother Whabi Mohammad, Ramzi used to set up a table with Islamic literature at local football games.

== Arrest and trial ==
His brother Whabi Mohammad was also arrested in a separate raid outside Notting Hill.

In February 2007 he stood trial along with 5 others for his part in the bombings. On 24 January, the court released dramatic video of Ramzi Mohammed attempting to detonate his device. The carriage quickly emptied, apart from one man who stayed behind to reason with him, an off-duty fireman named Angus Campbell.

On 9 July 2007 Ramzi Mohammed was found guilty at Woolwich Crown Court of conspiracy to murder and sentenced to life imprisonment with a minimum term of forty years.

== Appeal ==
April 2008 the court of appeal judges dismissed a challenge by Ibrahim, Omar, Mohammed and Osman to their convictions.

In December 2014, an appeal to the European Court of Human Rights lodged in 2008 by the bombers claiming that their rights were breached in the 'safety interviews' after their arrests was rejected.

== See also ==
- Muktar Said Ibrahim
- Yasin Hassan Omar
- Osman Hussain
- Manfo Kwaku Asiedu
- Adel Yahya
