= Girmay =

Girmay, also transliterated as Ghirmai, Ghirmay, Girmaye or Grmay is a name of Ethiopian and Eritrean origin. Notable people with this name include:

== Girmay ==
- Aracelis Girmay (born 1977), American poet
- Biniam Girmay (born 2000), Eritrean professional road cyclist
- Dagmawit Girmay Berhane (born 1975), Ethiopian sports director
- Girmay Zahilay (born 1987), American politician serving as a member of the King County Council in the state of Washington

== Ghirmai ==
- Filmon Ghirmai (born 1979), Eritrean-born German steeplechase runner
- Ghirmai Efrem (born 1996), Eritrean-Swedish swimmer
- Philmon Ghirmai (born 1984), German politician

== Ghirmay ==
- Ghirmay Ghebreslassie (born 1995), Eritrean long-distance runner

== Girmaye ==
- Girmaye Gabre (born 1950), Ethiopian boxer

== Grmay ==
- Tsgabu Grmay (born 1991), Ethiopian professional road cyclist

== See also ==
- Girma
