= O'Farrell v. Governor of Portlaoise Prison =

Supreme Court of Ireland case

O'Farrell v Governor of Portlaoise Prison
- Coat of arms of Ireland
- Court: Supreme Court of Ireland
- Full case name: O'Farrell & ors v Governor of Portlaoise Prison
- Citation: [2016] IESC 37, [2016] 3 R 619

Case history
- Appealed from: The High Court of Ireland
- Appealed to: The Supreme Court of Ireland

Court membership
- Judges sitting: O'Donnell J, Clarke J, Denham J, Laffoy J, MacMenamin J, O'Malley J

Keywords
- habeas corpus

O'Farrell and Others v Governor of Portlaoise Prison, [2016] IESC 37, [2016] 3 IR 619 is an Irish Supreme Court case where the Court dismissed an appeal made by the State against a High Court decision which ordered the release of prisoners who had been transferred from the United Kingdom to the Republic of Ireland to carry out the rest of their sentences. The Supreme Court, taking into account the relevant provisions of the Transfer of Sentenced Persons Act 1995, decided that there was no legal basis to detain the respondents as there was a failure to comply with legislative requirements concerning the adaptation of foreign prison sentences. The Court also ruled that section 9 of the Transfer of Sentenced Persons Act 1995 did not give it the authority increase the respective prison sentences of three prisoners.

This case is significant to the extent that it exposed a serious flaw in the Irish penal system in its implementation of prison sentences imposed by courts of other jurisdictions and resulted in the early release of a number of prisoners.

== Background ==
Facts of the Case

The appellant along with two others had been convicted of conspiring to commit a number of terrorist offences after a failed attempt to procure assistance for the Real Irish Republican Army from the Iraqi Secret service. The accused persons had travelled to Slovakia, under the assumption that they would meet with Iraqi arms dealers to negotiate the purchase of weapons and explosives. As it transpired, the meeting was in fact an undercover sting operation which had been organised by members of the British Secret Service. The accused persons were arrested and extradited to the United Kingdom where they entered guilty pleas before Woolwich Crown Court. The accused were sentenced to 30 years imprisonment which was backdated to correspond with the time of their arrest having been in 2001. In July 2015, these sentences were reduced to 28 years by the English and Welsh Court of Appeal.

In August 2005, the appellant along with the co-accused applied for a transfer under the Transfer of Sentenced Persons Act 1995, to serve out the duration of their sentences in Ireland. This Act implemented the Irish State's responsibilities contained within the Council of Europe Convention on the Transfer of Sentenced Persons, a primarily humanitarian measure which is aimed at facilitating the rehabilitation of prisoners serving custodial sentences in foreign jurisdictions by allowing them to serve the rest of their sentences in their country of citizenship. An official from the Department of Justice wrote to the prisoners and informed them that they would serve a longer custodial sentence if they chose to avail of the transfer. This was attributed to the differences that exist between the two jurisdictions with regards to sentencing. Under the UK Criminal Justice Act at the time, prisoners that were serving sentences exceeding one year would serve two-thirds of their sentence in custody followed by a period of community service. Under the terms of the English sentence, the prisoners would have been entitled to release on licence after 18 years and 8 months. Under the Irish system the maximum period of remission is 25% and not one third. The prisoners wrote back to the Minister of Justice and accepted that condition as a ramification of the transfer. In July 2006, an application was made to the High Court for warrants to arrange for the transfer of each prisoner to Portlaoise Prison.

While the transfers were pending, the sentencing differences between the two jurisdictions in the context of the Transfer of Persons Act 1995 was considered by the Supreme Court in Vincent Sweeney v Governor of Loughlan House Open Centre and Others. In this particular case, the appellant had been sentenced to sixteen years imprisonment by an English Court, half of which was to be served in custody with the remaining half on licence. The appellant who had transferred from the United Kingdom to Ireland under the Transfer of Persons, contested his continued detention after his eight years in custody had been served. The Supreme Court concluded that, since there was no facility in Ireland for the appellant to serve his supervised release on licence, he was entitled to be released once he served his custodial sentence.

High Court

Pursuant to the Sweeney decision, O'Farrell brought a habeas corpus petition to the High Court, with Hogan J presiding. O'Farrell argued that the warrant justifying his sentence was defective on the grounds that it failed to mention his entitlement to release after 18 years as provided for in the original sentence. Under Article 40.4 of the Constitution, the High Court is obliged to "enquire into" complaints from the prisoners alleging unlawful detainment. The High Court found that prison sentences from the UK were ineffective, unless they had been adapted by the Irish courts before transferring into the jurisdiction and not after the transfer, as was the case here. In September 2014, the court ordered the release of the prisoners on the grounds that the warrants were defective, as they had "incorrectly" recorded the sentence as being for 28 years instead of 18 years and eight months.

== Holding of the Supreme Court ==
A seven judge panel presided over the appeal from the High Court. All seven justices concurred that warrants were defective, as a result of the Sweeney decision. The question before the court was whether the warrants could be updated to record that, under Irish law, the sentences were to last around eighteen years and were to start from the date of their arrest in 2001. This was a split decision, with four judges (McKechnie J, MacMenamin J, Laffoy J and O'Malley J) agreeing to dismiss the appeal while three judges dissented (Denham CJ, O'Donnell J and Clarke J).

Concurring

The majority of justices dismissed the State's appeal. Laffoy J, MacMenamin J and O'Malley J concurring, ruled that section 9 of the 1995 Act could only be used by the High Court to vary one or two minor provisions of the warrants which did not include the duration of the original sentences. As the sentences imposed by the English Court were for 28 years, subject to release after the completion of two thirds, it was not within the jurisdiction of the Irish Court to extend them. MacMenamin J concluded that the process whereby the respondents were detained in Ireland was fundamentally defective and the warrants were void ab initio.

Laffoy J, following on from the reasoning of the High Court, found that the Minister for Justice had tried to incorporate new conditions into the sentences which should have been done in the adaption process prior to the transfers. The same judge stated that the new conditions which the Minister sought to incorporate into the warrant would "fundamentally change, from an overall perspective both the legal nature and duration of the sentence imposed by the sentencing State", as it eliminated the component of the sentence which included release on licence in the community. The court was of the view that such a modification would have "required the making of an adaptation order in 2006 and cannot be dealt with by means of an order to vary the warrant under s. 9(1) many years after the transfer has taken place."

Dissenting

In a jointly written judgement, O'Donnell J, Clarke J and Denham CJ expressed that they would have permitted the State's appeal. O'Donnell J and Clarke J examined the primary humanitarian objectives of the convention, which was to facilitate the transfer of prisoners serving custodial sentences in other jurisdictions back to their home countries to enable them to be close to their families. While they acknowledged that the warrants were defective, they noted that the sentencing court had a valid order for the prisoners detention. It was also stated that section 9 of the 1995 Act permits variation so as to give effect to aims of the convention. The dissenting judges concluded that a variation to the warrant which effectively implemented the custodial component of the English sentence but removed the release on licence component would have been permissible.

== Subsequent developments ==
In a report from the Irish Examiner in May 2015, it was revealed that a number of prisoners who had transferred from Britain to Ireland under the Transfer of Sentenced Persons Act 1995 have since been released on similar terms. In 2016, The Minister for Justice issued a statement declaring that all further transfer requests under this legislation were to be put on hold until the law was clarified. This had the effect of halting all further requests, irrespective of the country of imprisonment until the law was clarified. As of May 2018, transfer applications for most countries have resumed and are currently being processed by the Chief State Solicitor's Office. Transfer Requests from the UK are still on hold, as no legislation has been passed to resolve the difficulties in adapting these sentences into Irish Law.
