= Mohammed Hamid =

Mohammed Hamid may refer to:

- Mohammed Hamid (businessman), Ugandan national of Arab descent, born in Sudan
- Mohammed Hamid (terrorist), British national of Indian descent, born in Tanzania
