= Nigel Sweeney =

British judge (born 1954)

The Honourable Mr Justice Sweeney
- Royal coat of arms of the United Kingdom

High Court Judge (King's Bench Division)
- Incumbent
- Assumed office 1 October 2008
- Monarchs: Elizabeth II; Charles III

Personal details
- Born: 18 March 1954 (age 72) United Kingdom
- Education: University of Nottingham

Sir Nigel Hamilton Sweeney KC (born 18 March 1954), styled The Hon. Mr Justice Sweeney, is a former High Court judge. He retired on 18 March 2023.

== Biography ==
Sweeney studied law at the University of Nottingham under Sir John Cyril Smith. He was called to the bar in 1976 at the Middle Temple, where he was made a bencher in 1997, that same year he was appointed First Senior Prosecuting Counsel to the Crown, and was appointed Queen's Counsel in 2000. He was appointed to the High Court (Queen's Bench) in September 2008.

Prior to being appointed a High Court judge, Sweeney was a barrister in the United Kingdom, practising from 6 King's Bench Walk and specialising in terrorism, official secrets, murder and major health and safety trials. He prosecuted a number of notable criminal trials, including the perpetrators of the 1984 IRA Brighton bombing and the attempted bombings of 21 July 2005, Neo-Nazi terrorist David Copeland and murderers Michael Stone and Kamel Bourgass.

Sweeney was appointed Presiding Judge of the South Eastern Circuit in 2012, and the Judge in Charge of the Terrorism List in 2013. He was also the Judge responsible for European Liaison in relation to criminal law issues, and was a member of the Judges’ Council.

He presided over the trial in February and March 2013 of former Secretary of State for Energy and Climate Change Chris Huhne MP and his former wife, Vicky Pryce, for perverting the course of justice contrary to common law. He sentenced another MP, Denis MacShane, to six months in prison for false accounting in the aftermath of the 2009 parliamentary expenses scandal.

He presided over and was sentencing judge in high-profile cases involving terrorists and extremists, such as the two men responsible for the murder of Lee Rigby in 2013, the man convicted of the murder of MP David Amess and White supremacist bomber Pavlo Lapshyn

He was also involved in numerous other high profile cases. He was the presiding judge in the trial of Rolf Harris for various counts of indecent assault dating back to the 1960s. He was the sentencing judge for the murder of Sabina Nessa, sentencing Koci Selemaj to a minimum of 36 years in prison. He was also the presiding judge in the Essex lorry deaths trials where 39 Vietnamese people were killed in the back of a lorry; four perpetrators received a combined 92 years in prison.

Sweeney is also an associate professor at the School of Law at Nottingham University.

== Notable cases ==
- 2020 Reading stabbings
- Babes in the Wood murders (Brighton)
- Murder of David Amess
- Murder of Lee Rigby
- Murder of Lynette White
