= London Buses route 26 =

London bus route

26
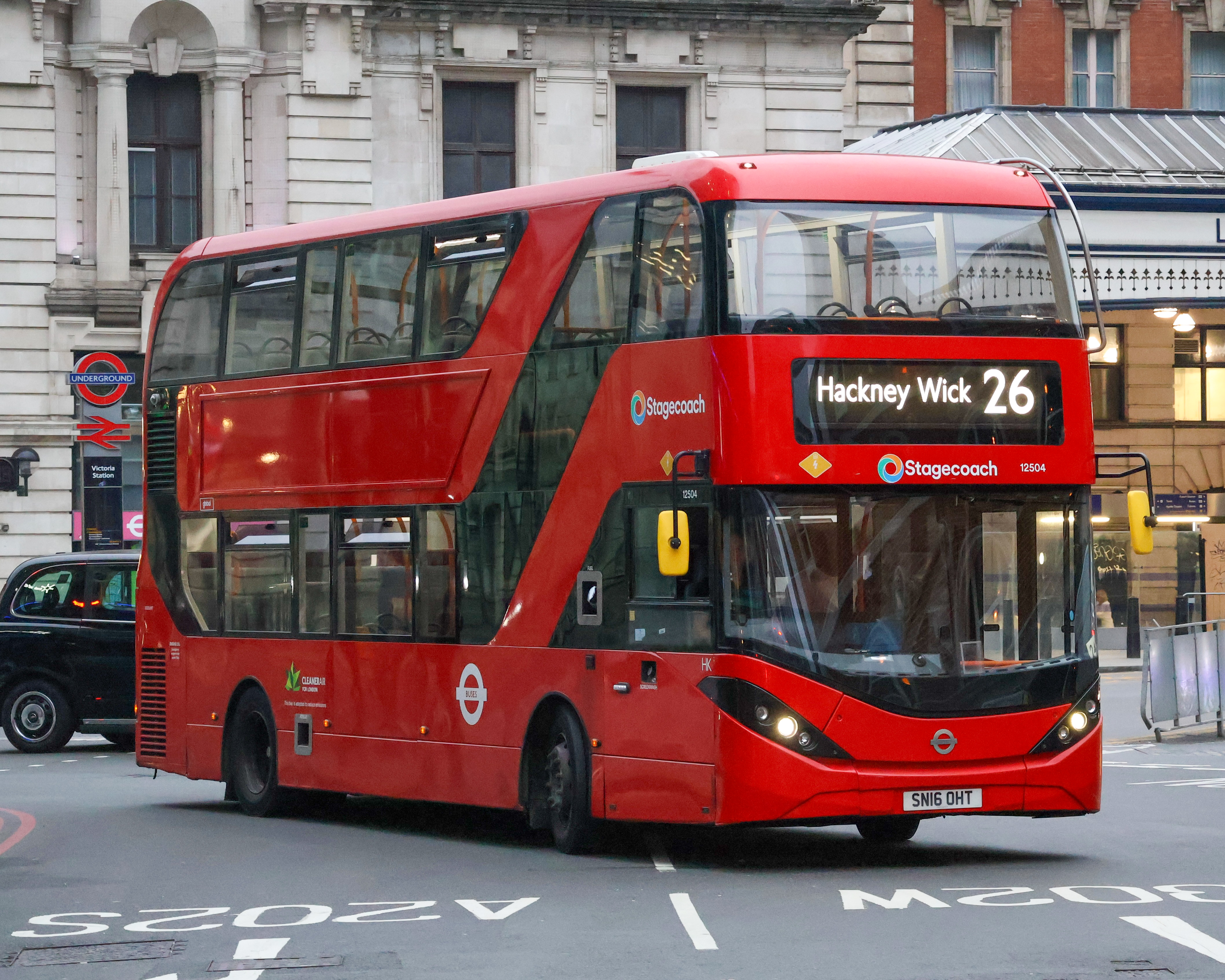
- East London Alexander Dennis Enviro400H City at Victoria station in June 2025

Overview
- Operator: East London (Stagecoach London)
- Garage: Ash Grove
- Vehicle: Alexander Dennis Enviro400H City
- Peak vehicle requirement: 20
- Predecessors: Route 6
- Night-time: Night Bus N26

Route
- Start: St Mary of Eton
- Via: Cambridge Heath; Shoreditch; Liverpool Street; Aldwych; Trafalgar Square; Whitehall
- End: Victoria station
- Length: 7 miles (11 km)

Service
- Level: Daily
- Frequency: About every 10-12 minutes
- Journey time: 30-58 minutes
- Operates: 05:00 until 00:50

London Buses route 26 is a Transport for London contracted bus route in London, England. Running between St Mary of Eton and Victoria station, it is operated by Stagecoach London subsidiary East London.

== History ==
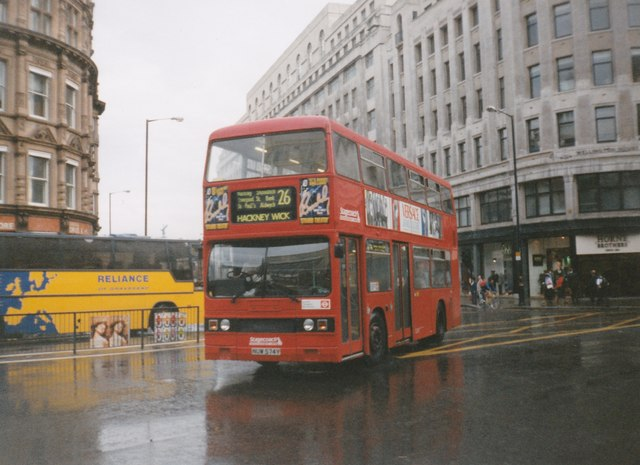
Stagecoach East London Leyland Titan on the Strand in August 1997

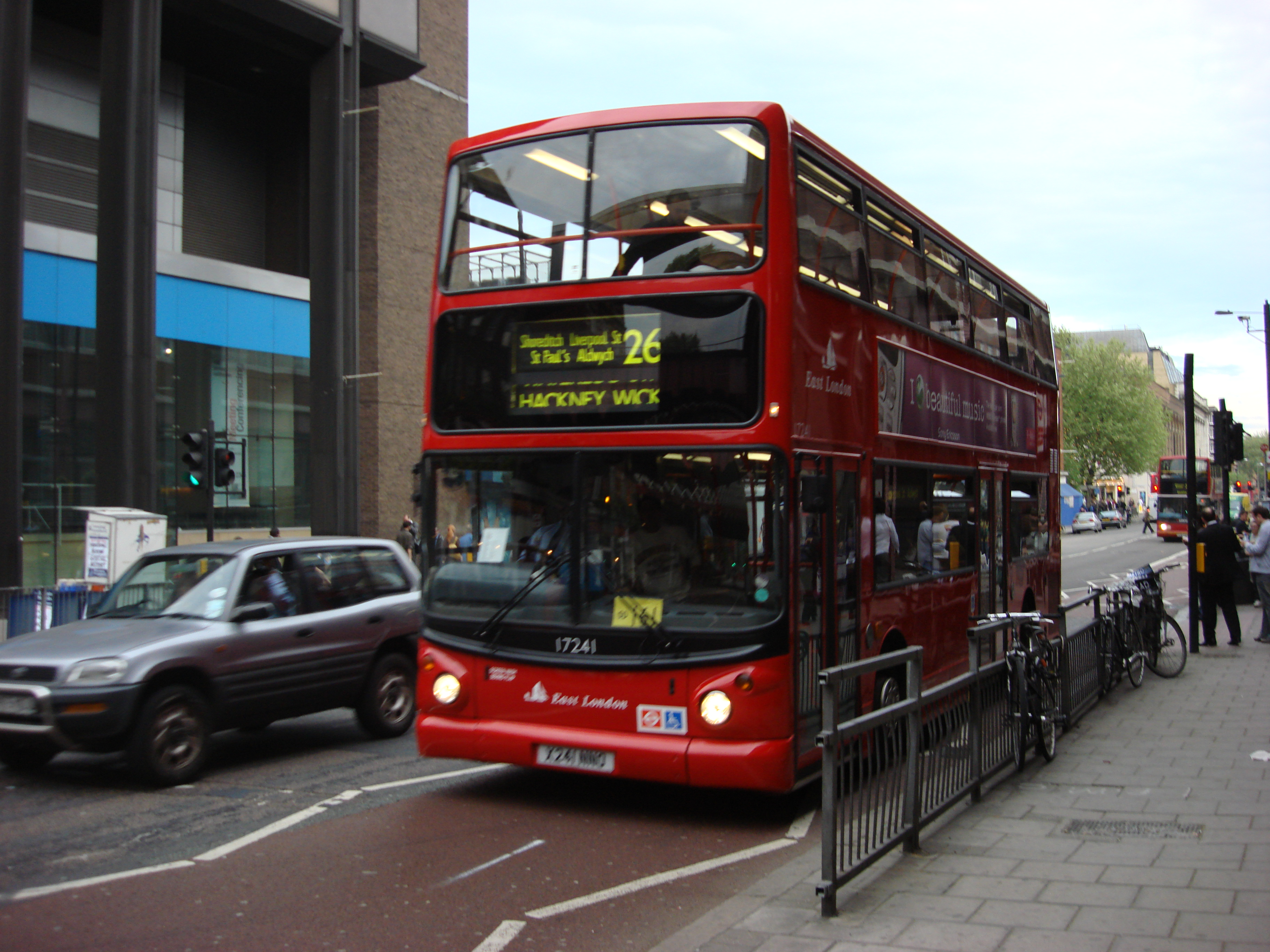
East London Alexander ALX400 bodied Dennis Trident 2 in April 2007

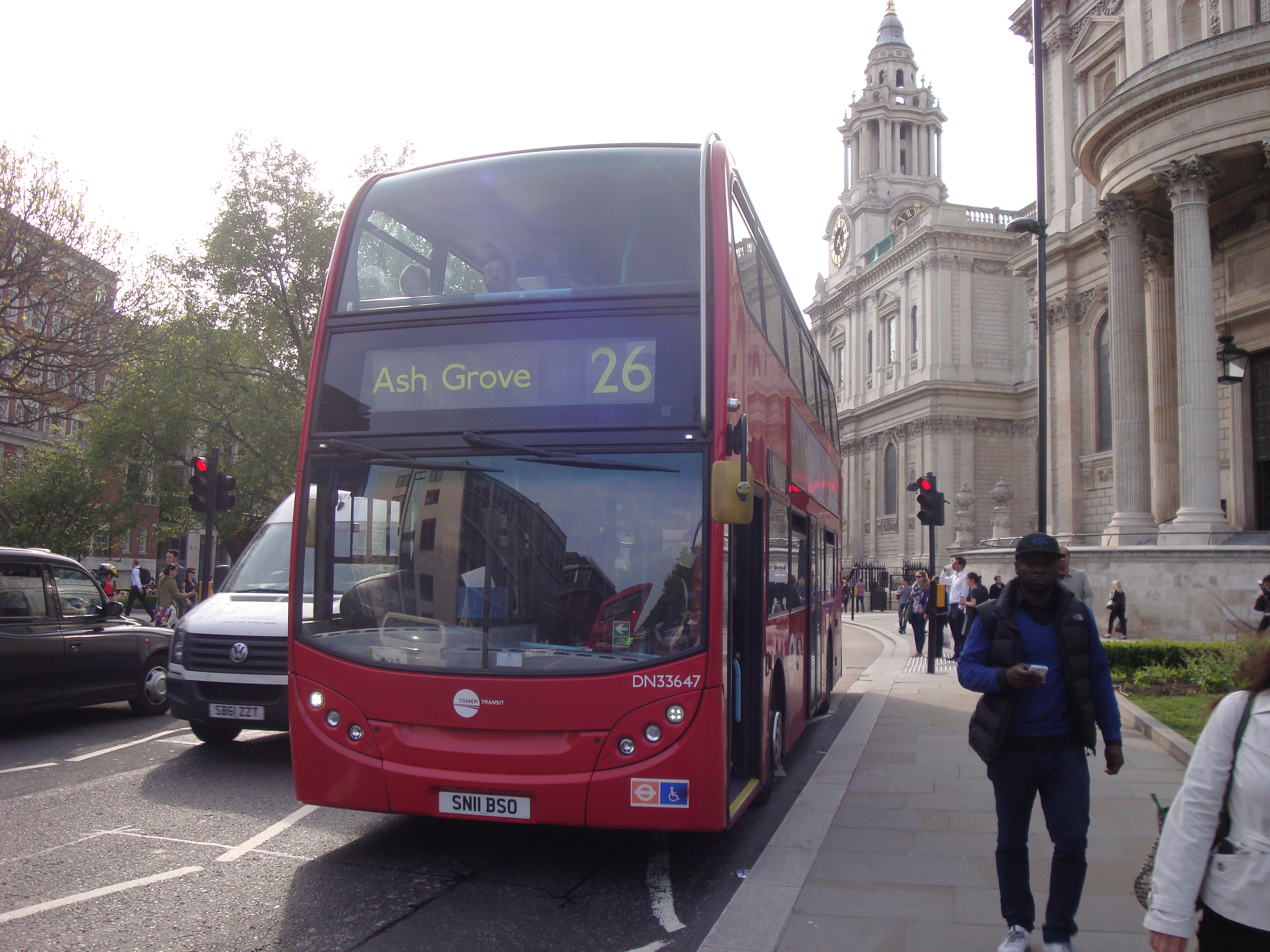
Tower Transit Alexander Dennis Enviro400 in April 2014

On 18 July 1992, route 26 was introduced to replace the withdrawn section of route 6 between Hackney Wick and Aldwych, running between Hackney Wick and Waterloo station from Bow garage using Leyland Titans. The Titans were replaced by a new fleet of 38 Alexander RL-bodied Volvo Olympians in late 1997.

Upon being re-tendered, on 25 June 2011 the route passed to First London's Lea Interchange garage with Wright Eclipse Gemini 2 bodied Volvo B9TLs.

On 22 June 2013, route 26 was included in the sale of First London's Lea Interchange garage to Tower Transit. When next tendered, it was awarded to CT Plus with the new contract commencing on 27 February 2016. It is operated out of Ash Grove garage.

On 27 August 2022, route 26 was included in the sale of HCT Group's ‘red bus’ operations to Stagecoach London.

On 23 November 2022, it was announced that a proposed rerouting of route 26 at Aldwych to serve Victoria instead of Waterloo would be going ahead following a consultation; it was implemented on 29 April 2023.

== Bomb incident ==
On 21 July 2005, would-be bomber Muktar Said Ibrahim attempted to explode a device contained in his rucksack on a number 26 bus on Hackney Road in Haggerston. A small explosion on the top deck caused the vehicle's windows to explode, but the device did not detonate as intended and there was no significant damage. The vehicle, operated by Stagecoach London, was stopped and a 200-yard safety cordon established while the bomb was defused.

Ibrahim left the bus following the failed attack, but was later caught. He and five other men were taken to court in January 2007, and his DNA was found on a battery used in the bomb. He was convicted in July 2007 and sentenced to life imprisonment.

== Current route ==
Route 26 operates via these primary locations:

- St Mary of Eton
- South Hackney
- Cambridge Heath station
- Hoxton station
- Shoreditch High Street station
- Liverpool Street station
- Bank station
- Mansion House station
- City Thameslink station
- Aldwych
- Charing Cross station
- Trafalgar Square
- Westminster station
- St James's Park station
- Victoria station
