= Philmon Ghirmai =

German politician (born 1984)

- Ghirmai in 2026

Member of the Berlin House of Representatives
- Incumbent
- Assumed office 29 October 2026

Personal details
- Born: 1984 (age 41–42)
- Party: Alliance 90/The Greens

Philmon Ghirmai (born 1984) is a German politician who was elected member of the Berlin House of Representatives in 2026. He has served as co-chairman of Alliance 90/The Greens in Berlin since 2021.
