= Nahu Senay Girma =

Ethiopian women's rights activist

- Born: Mekelle, Ethiopia
- Occupation: Management consultant
- Known for: Charity work and women's rights activism

Nahu Senay Girma is an Ethiopian women's rights activist. She is the co-founder and executive director of the Association of Women in Boldness (AWiB), a non-governmental organisation established in April 2010 to train women for leadership roles, and has established several charities.

== Career ==
Nahu Senay Girma was born in Mekelle. Her father, who died at the age of 34, gave her a traditionally masculine name which translates as "something good is happening now", because he was so pleased to have a daughter. She had three siblings, two of whom fell victim to the actions of the Derg regime. Girma lived with her paternal grandmother in Addis Ababa until the age of 7 and then attended an all-girls boarding school. She worked abroad in Canada, the United States, and Italy before returning to Ethiopia.

Girma works as a management consultant. Her commissions have included training seminars on cross-cultural working for IBM, Scientific Atlanta, Delta Air Lines, and BellSouth. She has also developed team building courses for the American government and training programmes for the United Nations Economic Commission for Africa and Ethiopian Airlines. She has two children who have both been educated at Harvard University.

Girma has been very active in charity work. In Atlanta, Georgia, she founded Children Services International in 2000 to work with Ethiopian high school dropouts to provide training and assist them in finding jobs. She worked with the Cleveland chapter of the Red Cross; a diversity training programme that she developed for them was piloted across the whole of the Red Cross in the USA. Girma also served on the boards of the Young Women's Christian Association (YWCA) in Marietta and an abused women's shelter in Atlanta. In Ethiopia she has served on the boards of the local branch of the YWCA and the Sara Cannizzaro Child Minders Association. She founded Addis Woubet, a project to renovate and preserve historic buildings in the Ethiopian capital, and Women for Life, which aims to reduce maternal death rates. Women for Life is currently working to upgrade the Gandhi Hospital. Girma has personally sponsored the college education of ten children.

Girma is co-founder (with Roman Kifle) and executive director of African Women in Business, a non-governmental organisation established in April 2010 to train women to become leaders in their communities. The organisation hosts an online forum and e-learning courses to develop women as entrepreneurs. In March 2014 she was the moderator of a discussion with young people on women's role in leadership and development organised by the United Nations Communications Group and Addis Ababa University.

== See also ==
- Women in Ethiopia
