= Yeshshiemebet Girma =

Ethiopian imprisoned on terror charges

- Born: 1977 (age 48–49); Ethiopia
- Known for: 21 July 2005 London bombings

Yeshshiemebet Girma (born c. 1977) was the second person (and first woman) charged under the Terrorism Act over the 21 July 2005 London bombings, along with her sister Muluemebet Girma. She is married to Hamdi Adus Isaac who was found guilty of having placed an explosive at the Shepherd's Bush tube station. Her charge related to her failure to supply information that could have helped apprehend one of the suspects of the bombings.

She is from Ethiopia. The couple have three children and lived in Stockwell, South London.

On 11 June 2008, she was convicted of assisting an offender and withholding information from the police. A court heard that she helped her husband flee police by driving him to Brighton as well as having knowledge of the bomb plot before it was executed.

On 12 June 2008, she was jailed for 15 years. This was reduced to 11 years on appeal.

== See also ==
- 7 July 2005 London bombings
- Ismael Abdurahman
