= Muluemebet Girma =

Ethiopian imprisoned on terror charges

Muluemebet (Mulu) Girma (born c. 1984 in Ethiopia) was the third person (and second woman) charged under the Terrorism Act 2000 over the 21 July 2005 London bombings, along with her sister Yeshshiemebet Girma. She was charged with "failing to disclose information that could have helped police secure the arrest, prosecution or conviction of a person involved in terrorism", convicted, and sentenced to imprisonment.

== Involvement in 21 July 2005 London bombings ==
Girma was born in Ethiopia but had resided in Britain for a number of years. She was a former contestant in the Miss Brighton competition, model and graduate in pharmaceutical science from the University of Brighton and her sister, Yeshi, was married to Hussein Osman one of the failed suicide bombers.

She was arrested on 27 July 2005 and in early August was charged under Section 38 of the Terrorism Act 2000 with

"having information that they knew or believed might be of material assistance in securing the apprehension, prosecution or conviction of another person in the UK for an offence involving the commission, preparation or instigation of an act of terrorism, failed to disclose that information as soon as reasonably practicable to a constable"

In June 2008 she was found guilty of assisting an offender and failing to disclose information on the 21 July plot. The jury was undecided on another charge of assisting an offender. She was jailed for 10 years.

== Post gaol ==
In 2010, it was reported that Girma was "on a list of those who have been freed from prison or are close to being released", as she was eligible for release in the following two years.

In September 2011 she was among a group of seven fighting deportation on human rights grounds. She was employed as a trainee assistant at Southwark Council in 2013 soon after being released from jail, but had not revealed her criminal record; she was later dismissed when her background came to light.

== See also ==
- 7 July 2005 London bombings
- Ismael Abdurahman
