= Yasin Hassan Omar =

Member of al-Qaeda

- Born: 1 January 1983 (age 43); Somalia
- Arrested: 27 July 2005; Heybarnes Road, Small Heath, Birmingham; West Midlands Police
- Citizenship: British, Somali
- Other name: Yassen
- Charge(s): Conspiracy to murder Attempted murder Possession of explosives
- Penalty: Life imprisonment, with possibility of parole after forty years served
- Status: Incarcerated
- Spouse: Fardosa Abdullah

Yasin Hassan Omar (sometimes spelt Yassin; born 1 January 1983) is a British Somali convicted terrorist. Omar was arrested and tried for his involvement in the attempted 21 July attacks on London's public transport system. He was found guilty of attempting to detonate a device on the London Underground Victoria line tube train between Warren Street and Oxford Circus tube stations. In August 2005 police gave his age as 24 after his arrest.

== Omar's background ==
Omar was originally from Somalia and arrived in the UK as a child dependent of asylum seekers, in 1992. He was granted indefinite leave to remain in 2000.

== Arrest ==
Omar was one of four men arrested on Wednesday 27 July 2005 at 0430 BST, in a property on Heybarnes Road, in the Small Heath area of Birmingham. He was then taken to London's Paddington Green police station for questioning.

Police used a 'Taser' stun gun to detain him. This was criticised as an incredible risk by Metropolitan Police Commissioner Ian Blair, saying "If there is a bomb on that body, then the bomb is going to go off". West Midlands Police disagreed and said Sir Ian Blair did not know the full circumstances surrounding the arrest, but they still voluntarily referred the matter to the Independent Police Complaints Commission.

== Charges ==
On 6 August 2005 he was charged with four criminal charges:

- On or before 21 July, conspiracy with others unknown to murder passengers on the London transport system.
- On 21 July, attempted murder of passengers on the London transport system.
- On or before 21 July, conspiracy with others unknown to cause explosions likely to endanger life or cause serious damage to property.
- On 21 July, unlawful and malicious possession of explosives with the intent of endangering life or causing serious damage to property.

== Trial ==
On 28 April 2006, Omar, along with his co-accused pleaded not guilty to all charges against him and was placed on trial with 5 other suspects.

His fiancée, Fardosa Abdullah, was arrested on 4 October 2006. She was charged with assisting Omar in evading arrest and with failing to disclose information which could have led to Omar's arrest or conviction "as soon as reasonably practicable". She was subsequently jailed for three years.

On 9 July 2007, Yasin Hassan Omar was found guilty at Woolwich Crown Court of conspiracy to murder and sentenced to life imprisonment, with a minimum of 40 years before being considered for release.

== Appeal ==
In April 2008, the court of appeal judges dismissed a challenge by Ibrahim, Omar, Mohammed and Osman to their convictions.

In December 2014, an appeal to the European Court of Human Rights lodged in 2008 by the bombers, claiming that their rights were breached in the 'safety interviews' after their arrests, was rejected.

== See also ==
- Muktar Said Ibrahim
- Hussain Osman
- Ramzi Mohammed
