= Sweeney v Governor of Loughan House Open Centre =

Irish Supreme Court case

Vincent Sweeney v Governor of Loughlan House Open Centre and Others
- Coat of arms of Ireland
- Court: Supreme Court of Ireland
- Full case name: Vincent Sweeney, Applicant v. The Governor of Loughan House Open Centre, The Minister for Justice and Law Reform, Ireland and The Attorney General, Respondents
- Decided: 3 July 2014
- Citations: [2014] 2 ILRM 401; [2014] IESC 42; [2014] 2 IR 732

Case history
- Appealed from: Vincent Sweeney v Governor of Loughlan House Open Centre and Others [2014] IEHC 150

Court membership
- Judges sitting: Denham C.J., Murray J., Clarke J., Hardiman J., MacMenamin J.

Case opinions
- Under section 1 of the Transfer of Sentenced Person Act 1995 and Article 1 of the Convention of Transfer of Sentenced Persons the term "sentence" referred to a period of loss of liberty, or actual imprisonment. A sentence being served in the administering state must be of the same legal nature as imposed in the sentencing state.
- Decision by: Murray J.

Keywords
- Constitution; Transfer of Prisoners; Legal Nature of sentence imposed; Administration and Enforcement of Sentence; Transfer of Sentenced Persons Act 1995; Convention of Transfer of Sentenced Persons

Vincent Sweeney v Governor of Loughlan House Open Centre and Others [2014] 2 ILRM 401; [2014] IESC 42; [2014] 2 IR 732, was an Irish Supreme Court case in which the Court held that the sentenced served in the administrating state should be of the same legal nature as the sentence imposed by the sentencing state. This decision reversed a previous decision by the High Court that Sweeney's incarceration violated the Transfer of Sentenced Persons Acts 1995 and 1997.

== Background ==
The appellant in this case, Vincent Sweeney, was convicted of serious drug offenses in the United Kingdom on 7 December. The court sentenced him to 16 years imprisonment. Under English Law, this imprisonment consisted of serving 8 years in custody and serving the remaining half of his sentence on release on license in the community. During his sentence, the appellant sought to serve the remainder of his time in Ireland. On 16 December 2008 the appellant was transferred into Irish custody on a warrant issued by the High Court on the application of the Minister. This warrant stated that the plaintiff was the subject of a sentence of imprisonment of 16 years, with the respondent taking the Irish position that the plaintiff was entitled to be released, with remission, after 12 years in custody. In 2014, before the High Court, the appellant sought to have a declaration that the warrant issued was ultra vires the provisions of the Act of 1995 and the principles contained in the Convention, and be released from custody immediately. The High Court refused the declaration and the appellant appealed to the Supreme Court arguing the correct sentence of imprisonment was of 8 years.

== Opinion of the Court ==
Murray J. delivered the judgment to a unanimous court. They held that under section 1(1) the 1995 Act and the Convention the word "sentence" referred to a period of actual imprisonment and does not include any period of remission:

Sentence is defined as, any period of deprivation of liberty decided by a court or a tribunal as punishment in respect to an offense.

The sentence imposed onto the appellant by the Crown court was one of a period of a "deprivation of liberty" of 8 years and a second period of liberty under license of the final 8 years. Murray J. states that the Minister's interpretation of the appellants sentence was misconceived and that the actual term of imprisonment of the appellant should be 8 years as set out by the Crown Court, not 16 years:

"Murray J can see no reason to why the appellant would be required to spend his 16 sentence under the deprivation of liberty subject to the Irish terms of imprisonment especially the period of remission given by the Minister to prisoners for good behavior. This would mean the appellant would serve a sentence longer than what he was sentenced to in England. Murray J decided due to these reasons that the appellant is only required to serve 8 years imprisonment."

The administrating state should be bound by the legal nature and duration of the sentence imposed in the sentencing state. The sentence must be of continued enforcement by the administrating state and the court states that the warrant issued to transfer the appellant should be consistent with the sentence given by the Crown court following his conviction:

"Under subsection (5) to (7), a warrant shall be used to allow for a continued enforcement in the administrating state of a sentence ordered by the sentencing state including ant period of remission. The warrant shall have the same force and legal nature as the original sentencing warrant."

=== Conclusion ===
The Court allowed for the appellants appeal and directed the High Court to make the declaration "that he was not entitled to be detained on foot of the High Court order in question as and from the expiry of the first half of his sentence, namely, the 8 year period."

== Subsequent developments ==
Fintan Paul O'Farrell v Governor of Portlaoise Prison (No. 2) [2014] IEHC 420 and Ciara Fogarty v Provost and Others [2014] IEHC 417 rely on Sweeney.

== See also ==
O'Farrell v Governor of Portlaoise Prison
