= Muktar Said Ibrahim =

Eritrean-British terrorist

- Born: 24 January 1978 (age 48); Asmara, Eritrea
- Other name: Muktar Mohammed Said

Muktar Said Ibrahim (born 24 January 1978), also known as Muktar Mohammed Said, is an Eritrean-British terrorist. He is serving a life sentence with a minimum term of 40 years after being found guilty of involvement in the attempted 21 July attacks on London's public transport system in 2005. He attempted to detonate a device on a London bus in Haggerston and was arrested sharing an apartment with Ramzi Mohammed on 29 July 2005. The arrest culminated in Ramzi and Ibrahim standing near-naked, acting on orders issued by the police, to ensure that the suspects were not concealing any explosive devices.

He was originally from Asmara, and arrived in the UK as a child dependent of asylum seekers in 1990, and was granted residency in 1992. It has been reported that he applied for naturalisation as a British citizen in November 2003 and was issued with a British passport in September 2004. He had been living in Stoke Newington, London. Ibrahim was convicted of robbery and jailed for five years in 1996 for committing the crime and also carrying a knife. His family were apparently unaware of any involvement in terrorist activities and have publicly distanced themselves from him since the bombing attempts.

== Early life ==
Ibrahim was educated at Canons High School in Edgware.

== Arrest and trial ==
On 29 July 2005, Ibrahim was arrested and in February 2007 tried alongside five other suspects for his part in the attempted bombings.

On 9 July 2007, Ibrahim was found guilty at Woolwich Crown Court of conspiracy to murder and sentenced to life imprisonment, to serve a minimum of forty years before being considered for release.

== Appeal ==
In April 2008, Court of Appeal judges dismissed a challenge by Ibrahim, Omar, Mohammed and Osman to their convictions.

In December 2014, an appeal to the European Court of Human Rights lodged in 2008 by the bombers, claiming that their rights were breached in the 'safety interviews' after their arrests, was rejected.

== See also ==
- Yasin Hassan Omar
- Osman Hussain
- Ramzi Mohammed
