= Hamdi Adus Isaac =

Member of al-Qaeda

Hamdi Isaac
- Osman Hussein's after his capture by the Italian State Police in Rome, Italy
- Born: 27 July 1978 (age 48); Ethiopia
- Arrested: 29 July 2005; Rome, Italy; Italian State Police
- Citizenship: Yemeni, British
- Detained at: United Kingdom
- Other name: Hussain Osman or Hamdi Isaac
- Charge: Conspiracy to murder
- Penalty: Life sentence with a minimum of 40 years in prison
- Status: In prison
- Spouse: Yeshshiemebet Girma

Hamdi Adus Isaac (also Hussain Osman or Osman Hussain) (born 27 July 1978) is an Islamist terrorist who was found guilty of having placed an explosive at the Shepherd's Bush tube station during the failed 21 July 2005 London bombings. Born in Ethiopia, Hussain is a naturalised British citizen married to Yeshshiemebet Girma.

On 29 July 2005, he was arrested during a 40-officer raid at his brother-in-law's apartment in Rome, after mobile phone calls led police to believe he was hiding there. He was extradited to the UK in September under a European Arrest Warrant and charged with attempted murder. He stood trial along with five other suspects.

== Background ==
Former CSIS operative Huda Mukbil discusses in her book that Isaac spoke Arabic and Harari language.

== Motives ==
During the initial investigation in Rome, Hussain said he was motivated to participate in the attacks after viewing videos of war-torn Iraq. "I am against war," Osman said. "I've marched in peace rallies and nobody listened to me. I never thought of killing people." He explained that the bombs were never meant to detonate or kill anybody, only to draw attention to the Iraq war.

Hussain was alleged to have stated: "More than praying we discussed work, politics, the war in Iraq ... we always had new films of the war in Iraq ... more than anything else those in which you could see Iraqi women and children who had been killed by US and UK soldiers."

Other news sources reported that the bombers watched videos purportedly depicting Coalition troops killing women and children in Iraq before embarking on their mission. Some quoted him as saying "Muktar showed us some DVDs with images of the war in Iraq, especially women and children killed by American and British soldiers," Hussain said, adding that they were not to talk about these videos with others.

"There was a feeling of hatred and conviction that it was necessary to give signal — to do something." Hussain denied links with either the Al-Qaeda or the 7 July bombers. He claimed there was no bomb in his rucksack, just ordinary flour and a detonator meant to make the loud popping sound that was heard.

== Trial and sentence ==
On 9 July 2007, Hussain Osman was found guilty at Woolwich Crown Court of conspiracy to murder and sentenced to a minimum of 40 years in prison.

== Appeal ==
In April 2008, the Court of Appeal judges dismissed a challenge by Ibrahim, Omar, Mohammed and Osman to their convictions.

In December 2014, the European Court of Human Rights rejected an appeal lodged in 2008 by Ibrahim, Omar and Mohammed claiming that their rights were breached in the 'safety interviews' after their arrests.

== See also ==
- Jean Charles de Menezes, who was killed by police after being mistaken for Hussain.
- Muktar Said Ibrahim
- Yasin Hassan Omar
- Ramzi Mohammed
