= Oval tube station =

London Underground station

Oval
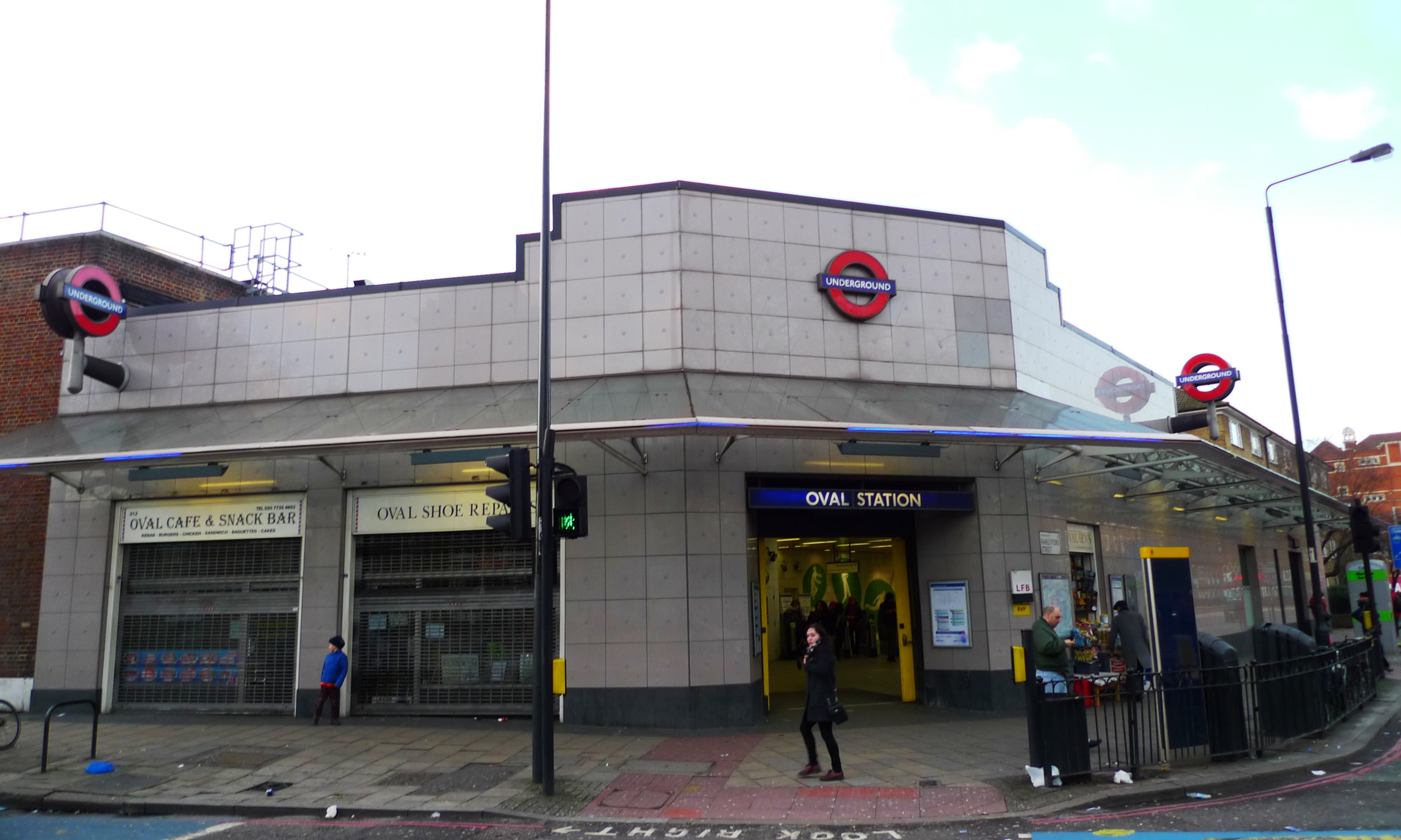
- Station entrance
- Interactive map of Oval

General information
- Location: Oval, London
- Local authority: Lambeth
- Managed by: London Underground
- Owner: London Underground
- Number of platforms: 2
- Fare zone: 2

London Underground annual entry and exit
- 2020: ▼3.31 million
- 2021: ▼3.13 million
- 2022: ▲5.36 million
- 2023: ▲5.62 million
- 2024: ▼5.41 million

Key dates
- 18 December 1890: Opened (C&SLR)
- 29 November 1923: closed for rebuilding
- 1 December 1924: reopened

Other information
- External links: TfL station info page
- Coordinates: 51.4819°N 0.1125°W

Oval is a London Underground station in the London Borough of Lambeth. It is on the Morden branch of the Northern line, between Kennington and Stockwell stations. It is in London fare zone 2. The station opened on 18 December 1890 as part of the City and South London Railway and is named after The Oval cricket ground, recognised as the first international cricket ground and home of Surrey County Cricket Club, which it serves.

The station features cricket-themed decorative elements, including murals, statues and banners. Due to the range of sporting events held at the Oval, the station is used by visitors from the United Kingdom and abroad, particularly during cricket matches.

== Location ==
The station is located at the junction of Kennington Park Road (heading north-east), Camberwell New Road (south-east), Clapham Road (south west) and Harleyford Street (north west) and is about 500 yards (450 m) from The Oval cricket ground. Also close by are Kennington Park and the imposing St Mark's Church.

== History ==
The City and South London Railway opened to passengers between Stockwell and King William Street on 18 December 1890, and was both the first standard gauge tube and the first railway to employ electric traction in London. To avoid disturbance of surface buildings the construction of the tube was shield-driven at deep level, and much of the work was done via shafts at station sites which later contained the passenger lifts.

Oval tube station was the intended site of one of the attempted London bombings on 21 July 2005.

== Services ==
Oval station is on the Morden branch of the Northern line in London fare zone 2. It is between Kennington to the north and Stockwell to the south. Train frequencies vary throughout the day, but generally operate every 3–6 minutes between 06:03 and 00:27 in both directions.

Preceding station	London Underground	Following station
Kennington towards Edgware, Mill Hill East or High Barnet	Northern line Morden branch	Stockwell towards Morden

== Connections ==
London Bus routes 3, 36, 59, 133, 155, 159, 185, 333, 415, and 436 and night routes N3, N109, N133, N136, and N155 serve the station.

== In popular culture ==
The station was mocked up by the television series Survivors: The Lights of London parts 1 & 2, broadcast on BBC One on 14 and 21 April 1976. However, the filmed site was actually at Camden Town deep-level shelter.

In 2004, station staff started to use a whiteboard to display a handwritten "thought of the day" from the Tao Te Ching for the benefit of passengers. This idea then spread to other Underground stations such as North Greenwich, where the content relates to events at the nearby O2 Arena.

== Sources ==
- Badsey-Ellis, Antony (2005). London's Lost Tube Schemes. Capital Transport. ISBN 1-85414-293-3.
- Badsey-Ellis, Antony (2016). Building London's Underground: From Cut-and Cover to Crossrail. Capital Transport. ISBN 978-1-8541-4397-6.
- Rose, Douglas (1999) [1980]. The London Underground, A Diagrammatic History (7th ed.). Douglas Rose/Capital Transport. ISBN 1-8541-4219-4.
- Wolmar, Christian (2005) [2004]. The Subterranean Railway: How the London Underground Was Built and How It Changed the City Forever. Atlantic Books. ISBN 1-84354-023-1.
