= Warren Street tube station =

London Underground station

Warren Street
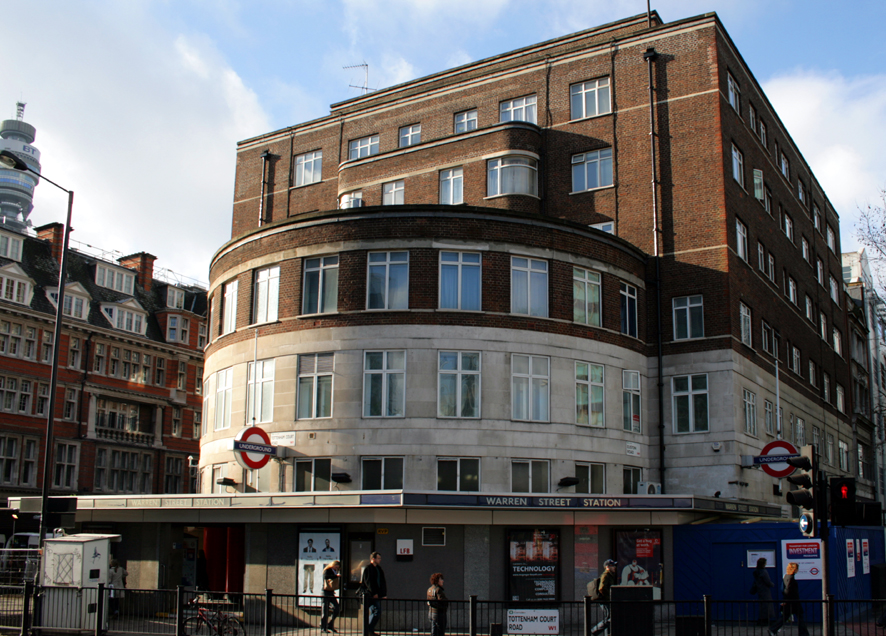
- Station building
- Interactive map of Warren Street

General information
- Location: Euston Road
- Local authority: London Borough of Camden
- Managed by: London Underground
- Number of platforms: 4
- Fare zone: 1
- OSI: Euston Square

London Underground annual entry and exit
- 2021: ▼7.04 million
- 2022: ▲13.01 million
- 2023: ▲14.08 million
- 2024: ▲14.16 million
- 2025: ▼13.85 million

Key dates
- 22 June 1907: Opened
- 1 December 1968: Victoria line opened

Other information
- External links: TfL station info page
- Coordinates: 51.52472°N 0.13833°W

Warren Street (/ˈwɒrən ˌstriːt/) is a London Underground station. It is located at the intersection of Tottenham Court Road and Euston Road in the northernmost part of Fitzrovia, and named after adjoining Warren Street. The station is served by the Northern and Victoria lines. It is in London fare zone 1. Even though it is used less than a number of neighbouring stations, it provides an interchange between the two lines as well as an exit for the University College Hospital (UCH).

The station opened in 1907 as Euston Road, and was designed by Leslie Green. It was refurbished in the 1930s by Charles Holden, when escalators were first installed. An extensive refurbishment took place in the late 1960s to accommodate the Victoria line, when it briefly acted as a temporary terminus. In 2012 it became the first station on the underground to have a dedicated public Wi-Fi service.

== Name and location ==
The premises adjoins Warren Street, Euston Road and Tottenham Court Road; Warren Street is named after the 18th-century naval officer Sir Peter Warren. The station is on the Charing Cross branch of the Northern line between Euston and Goodge Street stations, and on the Victoria line between Oxford Circus and Euston stations. It is in London fare zone 1 and is the nearest tube station to University College Hospital, being opposite the main building. It is also a 0.1-mile (160 m) walk to Euston Square on the Circle, Hammersmith & City and Metropolitan lines, which is at the other side of the hospital building.

London Buses routes 18, 24, 27, 29, 30, 73, 134, 205 and 390 and night routes N5, N20, N29, N73, N205, N253 and N279 serve the station.

The station has a relatively low footfall for Victoria line stations in the area. In 2020, the annualised total for Warren Street was around 7.7 million, lower than Euston (8.8 million), Green Park (9.4 million), Oxford Circus (14.6 million), Kings Cross St Pancras (18.8 million) and Victoria (23 million).

== History ==
=== Northern line ===
The station was part of the original Charing Cross, Euston and Hampstead Railway, running from Charing Cross to Camden Town. Work started on the station in 1902, designed by Leslie Green. It was opened along with the rest of the line on 22 June 1907 by the President of the Board of Trade, David Lloyd George, under the name "Euston Road". This name can still be seen in the Northern line platform tiling. The station's name changed to "Warren Street" the following year, on 7 June 1908.

In the early 1930s, Charles Holden designed a refurbishment for the station, including the surface building. In September 1933, the station was rebuilt, with escalators installed in place of the original lifts. Tripod gates were fitted to the station entrance in July 1968.

=== Victoria line ===
Warren Street was not in the original proposals for the Victoria line, but was added by the time work began in 1962. This was done to break up a lengthy section of tube between Euston and Oxford Circus, and provide an additional public transport access point to the local area.

The Victoria line platforms opened on 1 December 1968 as a temporary southern terminus of the line. Trains ran into the southbound platform and reversed; the northbound platform was not originally used. The interchange with the Northern Line was cumbersome as it involved a staircase and two escalators. The extension southwards towards Victoria officially opened on 7 March 1969, though through trains had been running since 24 February. Along with other Victoria line stations, the new complex was originally decorated with tiles showing an illustration relating to the station's name – in this case, a maze (signifying a warren).

=== Later history ===
On 27 April 2012, Warren Street station became the first London Underground Wi-Fi enabled tube station.

== Incidents ==
On 23 November 1984, a fire broke out in a maintenance compound near Oxford Circus. The Victoria line was part-suspended, with trains terminating at Warren Street. The line reopened on 17 December. The fire was believed to be caused by a discarded cigarette, which led to a smoking ban on all below-ground components of the Underground, including trains, platforms and stations. (Note: Following the King's Cross fire in 1987, smoking was banned on the Underground completely.)

== Cultural references ==
The Northern line northbound platform of the station was used for location filming in the 1972 horror film Death Line, featuring a group of cannibals living underground.

== Bibliography ==
- Butt, R. V. J. (October 1995). The Directory of Railway Stations: details every public and private passenger station, halt, platform and stopping place, past and present (1st ed.). Sparkford: Patrick Stephens Ltd. ISBN 978-1-85260-508-7. OCLC 60251199. OL 11956311M.
- Badsey-Ellis, Antony (2005). London's Lost Tube Schemes. Capital Transport. ISBN 185414-293-3.
- Day, John R; Reed, John (2010) [1963]. The Story of London's Underground. Capital Transport. ISBN 978-1-85414-341-9.
- Horne, M.A.C. (1988). The Victoria Line – A Short History. Douglas Rose. ISBN 978-1-870-35402-8.
- Lee, Charles Edward (1968). Sixty Years of the Northern. London Transport Board.
- Martin, Andrew (2012). Underground, Overground: A Passenger's History of the Tube. Profile Books. ISBN 978-1-847-65807-4.
- Smithers, Owen (2016). Automating the Northern line. Amberley. ISBN 978-1-445-65483-6.
- Weinreb, Ben; Hibbert, Christopher; Keay, John; Keay, Julia, eds. (2008) [1983]. The London Encyclopaedia (Third ed.). Macmillan. ISBN 978-1-405-04924-5.
- Wolmar, Christian (2005) [2004]. The Subterranean Railway: How the London Underground Was Built and How It Changed the City Forever. Atlantic Books. ISBN 1-84354-023-1.

Preceding station	London Underground	Following station
Euston towards Edgware, Mill Hill East or High Barnet	Northern line Charing Cross branch	Goodge Street towards Battersea Power Station, Morden or Kennington
Oxford Circus towards Brixton	Victoria line	Euston towards Walthamstow Central
