= Woolwich Crown Court =

Judicial building in Woolwich, London, England

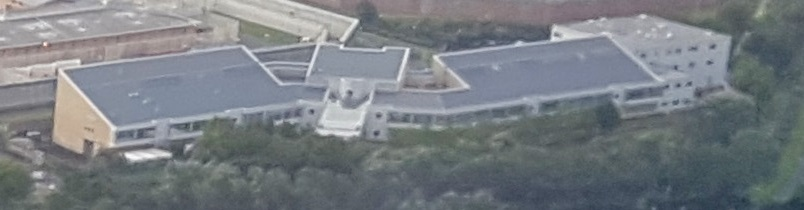
- Aerial photograph of Woolwich Crown Court

- Shown in London
- 51.4967°N 0.0900°E
- Location: Belmarsh Way, Thamesmead

History
- Built: 1993

Site notes
- Architect: Property Services Agency
- Architectural style: Modernist style

Woolwich Crown Court, or more accurately the Crown Court at Woolwich, is a Crown Court venue which deals with criminal cases on Belmarsh Way, Thamesmead, London, England.

== History ==
In the early 1990s, the Lord Chancellor's Department decided to commission a courthouse adjacent to HM Prison Belmarsh so offenders did not have to be transported to court by vehicle.

The building was designed by the Property Services Agency in the Modernist style, built by Hamills Construction in brick and concrete and was completed in 1993. The design involved a broadly symmetrical main frontage with an entrance block flanked by two wings, laid out a slightly different angles, facing onto Belmarsh Way. The entrance block featured a portico formed by columns supporting a glass canopy and was surmounted by a drum-like structure. The entrance block and the wings were faced in light grey cladding. Internally, the building was laid out with six courtrooms.

Woolwich Crown Court was intended to serve as a high-security courtroom and became the preferred venue for terrorism trials. A tunnel was established linking the court to the maximum-security HM Prison Belmarsh. This provided a secure route for bringing defendants in high-profile terrorist cases before the court. Also, armed police were deployed as necessary to provide security. In June 1998, it was the venue for the trial and conviction of defendants charged with conspiracy to cause the 1996 Docklands bombing.

The court was subsequently the venue for the trial and conviction, in June 2007, of the six men accused of attempting the 21 July 2005 London bombings on the London transport network, the trial and conviction, in December 2008, of Bilal Abdullah in connection with the 2007 Glasgow Airport attack, and the trial and conviction, in July 2010, of those charged with offences in connection with the 2006 transatlantic aircraft plot.

The court was also the place for the trial and conviction, in January 2018, of those charged with offences in connection with the 2015 Hatton Garden safe deposit burglary.
