= London attack =

London attack may refer to any of the following attacks that have occurred within London, London metropolitan area, City of London, Lundenwic, Londinium, or County of London, on the island of Great Britain:

== List ==
- List of terrorist incidents in London
  - 1973 Old Bailey bombing
  - 1973 Westminster bombing
  - 1974 Houses of Parliament bombing
  - 1974 Tower of London bombing
  - 1975 London Hilton bombing
  - 1976 Olympia bombing
  - 1979 Assassination of Airey Neave
  - 1981 Chelsea Barracks bombing
  - 1982 Hyde Park and Regent's Park bombings
  - 1983 Harrods bombing
  - 1991 Bombings of Paddington and Victoria stations
  - 1992 Baltic Exchange bombing
  - 1993 Bishopsgate bombing
  - 1996 Docklands bombing
  - 1999 London nail bombings
  - 7 July 2005 London bombings
  - 2017 London attack, several attacks
  - 2020 Streatham stabbing
- London Bridge attack, several attacks on the London bridge
- Westminster attack, attacks in the City of Westminster or Westminster; part of London
- Attacks on the London Underground
- Second World War bombings of London by Nazi Germany's Luftwaffe, see The Blitz
- First World War bombings of London by Imperial Germany, see German strategic bombing during World War I
- 1381 Raid on London, see Wat Tyler's Rebellion
- 1066 Battle of Southwark, see also Battle of Hastings
- 3rd century raids by Saxon pirates, see History of London
- AD 60 sacking of Londinium by the Iceni

=== Attempted attacks ===
- Gunpowder Plot (1605) of Guy Fawkes et al.
- 21 July 2005 London attempted bombings

== See also ==
- Battle of Brentford (disambiguation) in what is now West London
- The Battle of London – 1941 WWII propaganda film
- 2021 London, Ontario, truck attack
