= London Bridge (disambiguation) =

London Bridge may refer to:

== Bridges ==
- London Bridge, one of several bridges over the River Thames in central London, England
  - London Bridge (Roman times)
  - London Bridge (Early medieval times)
  - London Bridge (1209) (or "Old London Bridge")
  - London Bridge (1831) (or "New London Bridge"), the replacement for the 1209 London Bridge (see also Lake Havasu City entry below)
  - London Bridge (1973), the present-day London Bridge and replacement for the 1831 bridge
- London Bridge (Dublin), a bridge over the River Dodder, Ireland
- London Bridge (Lake Havasu City), Arizona, U.S., re-assembled from the 1831 British bridge

== Arts and entertainment ==
=== Film and television ===
- London Bridge (film), a 2014 Malayalam film
- London Bridge (TV series), regional British soap opera

=== Literature ===
- London Bridge: Guignol's Band II, a novel by Louis-Ferdinand Céline
- London Bridges, a novel by James Patterson

=== Music ===
- "London Bridge Is Falling Down", a traditional English nursery rhyme and singing game
- "London Bridge" a song by Bread from the 1969 album Bread
- "London Bridge", a song by Cilla Black
- "London Bridge" (Fergie song), 2006
- "London Bridge", a 2012 song by Ed Sheeran featuring Yelawolf from the 2012 EP The Slumdon Bridge

== Places ==
- London Bridge station, a railway terminus and connected London Underground station, England
- London Bridge (natural arch), on the coast of Torquay in Devon, England
- London Bridge (New South Wales), a limestone karst in Australia
- London Bridge (Victoria), an offshore natural arch formation in the Port Campbell National Park, Australia
- London Bridge City, a development in London, England
- London Bridge Tower, a building in London, England; now called "The Shard"
- London Bridge Studios, a recording studio in Seattle, Washington

== Other uses ==
- Operation London Bridge, the codename for plans surrounding the death of Queen Elizabeth II

== See also ==
- List of bridges in London
- Bridge (City of London ward), England
- Tower Bridge, sometimes mistakenly referred to as London Bridge
- Chapel of St Thomas on the Bridge, on the old London Bridge
- London Bridge attack (disambiguation), various attacks on or around the bridge
