= Westminster attack =

Westminster attack may refer to any of the following attacks that have occurred within Westminster or the City of Westminster:

== Attacks ==
- The Blitz (1940–1941) – affected London as a whole including Westminster.
- 1973 Westminster bombing, a car bomb outside the Home Office on Thorney Street
- 1974 Houses of Parliament bombing
- 1975 Piccadilly bombing, at a bus stop near The Ritz and Green Park tube station
- Assassination of Airey Neave, which took place at the Houses of Parliament car park in 1979
- Downing Street mortar attack (1991)
- Aldwych bus bombing (1996)
- 2017 Westminster attack, at Westminster Bridge and the Houses of Parliament
- 2017 Westminster cyberattack
- 2018 Westminster car attack

== Attempted attacks ==
- Gunpowder Plot (1605) by Guy Fawkes et al.

== See also ==
- London attack
