= 1st Earl of Suffolk =

1st Earl of Suffolk may refer to:

- Ralph the Staller, 1st Earl of Norfolk and Suffolk (c. 1011–1068)
- Robert Ufford, 1st Earl of Suffolk (1298–1369)
- Michael de la Pole, 1st Earl of Suffolk (c. 1330–1389)
- Thomas Howard, 1st Earl of Suffolk (1561–1626)

== See also ==
- Earl of Suffolk
