= 1973 London bombing =

1973 London bombing may refer to:

- 1973 Old Bailey bombing
- King's Cross station and Euston station bombings
- 1973 Westminster bombing
- December 1973 North Star pub bombing
