= Toby Harris, Baron Harris of Haringey =

British politician and life peer (born 1953)

The Right Honourable The Lord Harris of Haringey
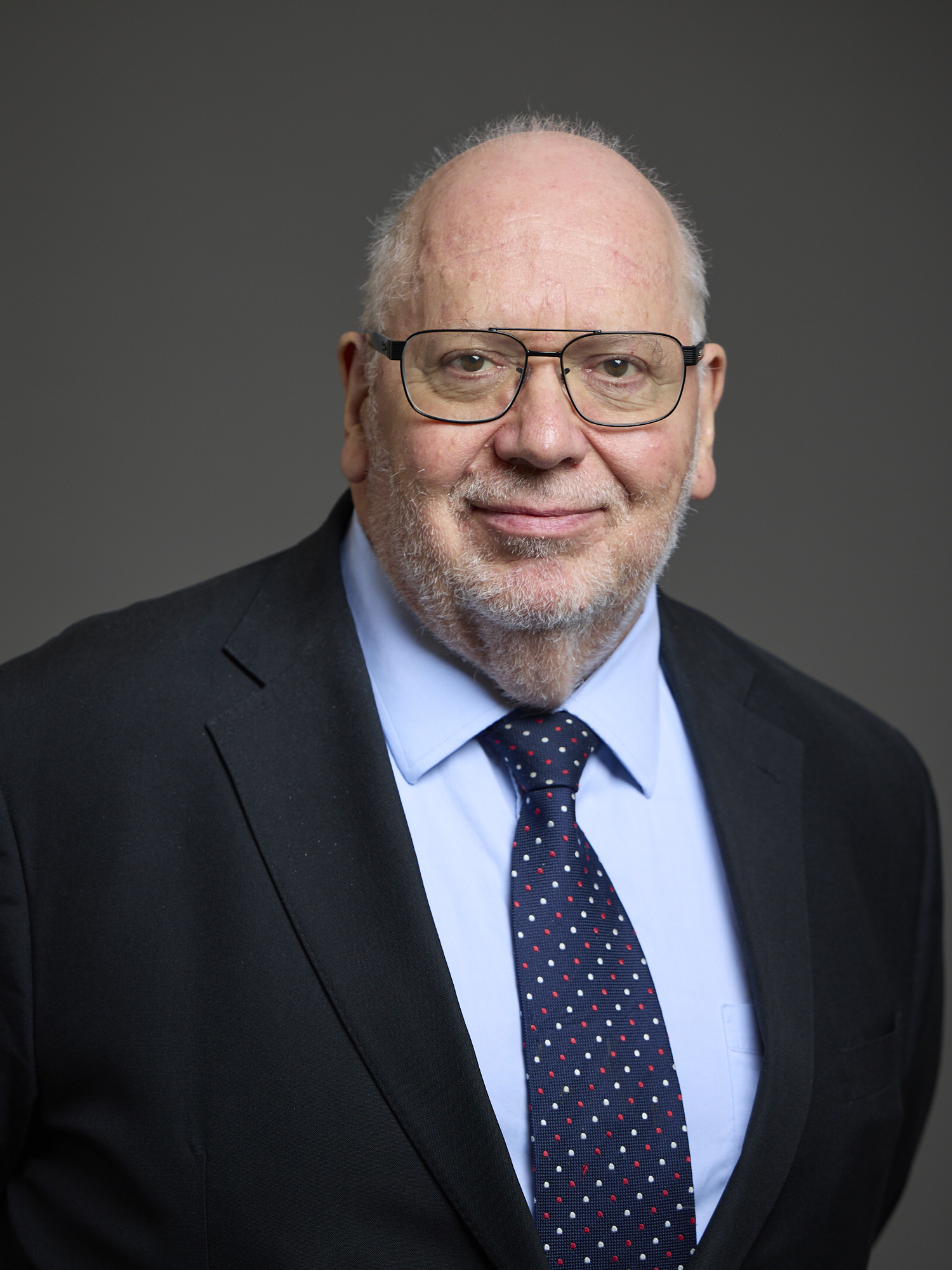
- Official portrait, 2026

Leader of the Labour Party in the London Assembly
- In office 3 July 2000 – 10 June 2004
- Leader: Tony Blair
- Preceded by: Position established
- Succeeded by: Len Duvall

Member of the House of Lords
- Lord Temporal
- Life peerage 5 August 1998

Member of the London Assembly for Brent and Harrow
- In office 4 May 2000 – 10 June 2004
- Preceded by: New constituency
- Succeeded by: Bob Blackman

Personal details
- Born: Jonathan Toby Harris; 11 October 1953 (age 73) London, England
- Party: Labour
- Education: Trinity College, Cambridge

Jonathan Toby Harris, Baron Harris of Haringey (born 11 October 1953) is a British economist and politician who has been a member of the House of Lords since 1998. A member of the Labour Party, he also served as its leader in the newly-established London Assembly from 2000 to 2004, where he represented Brent and Harrow.

== Family and education ==
Harris was born in North London, the son of geneticist Professor Harry Harris and Muriel Harris (née Hargest), a teacher. He was educated at Haberdashers' Aske's Boys' School, then a direct grant grammar school, which he attended on a local authority free place. He joined the Labour Party when he was sixteen and became Branch Secretary of the Highgate Ward Labour Party while still at school.

Harris went to Trinity College, Cambridge, where he read Natural Sciences for two years before switching to Economics. Whilst at Cambridge, he continued to be active politically and, like many students, joined all three political clubs so that he could attend their meetings. He was Chair of the Cambridge Fabians and Chair of the Cambridge University Labour Club, before becoming President of the Cambridge Union.

He holds an honorary doctorate from Middlesex University and was for a number of years a visiting professor at London South Bank University.

== Professional career ==
After Cambridge, Harris joined the Economics Division of the Bank of England, where he specialised in public sector finance. He also spent a period as Assistant to Christopher Dow, the eminent applied economist, who was then Executive Director of the Bank.

His next job was as Deputy Director of the Electricity Consumers' Council, where he led the pricing policy and social policy sides of the Council's work. He was Deputy Chair of the National Fuel Policy Forum and a member of the Council of Management of Neighbourhood Energy Action.

Harris then became Director of the Association of Community Health Councils for England and Wales, which was then the national statutory body representing the interests of the users of the National Health Service, from 1987 to 1998. He was a member of the Executive Committee of the Patients' Association and served on various Department of Health bodies, including Openness in the NHS Steering Group, the Mental Health Task Force Group, the NHS Charter Advisors Group, and the Committee on the Medical Effects of Air Pollution.

In 1998, Harris established Toby Harris Associates, which provided strategic advice to a wide range of public and private sector organisations. At various times, these included Unisys, Lockheed Martin, Microsoft, Airwave Solutions, Sunrise Radio, the National Grid and Humana Europe.

He was also for a number of years a Senior Advisor to KPMG, and a Senior Associate of the King's Fund, as well as being a Special Advisor to the Board of Transport for London.

He acts as UK Coordinator for the Electric Infrastructure Security Council that brings together the energy industry, lifeline infrastructure providers, central and local government, the voluntary sector and academia to help mitigate the risks of and consequences of a major wide-area and long-duration failure of electricity supplies.

== Political career ==
After university, Harris was National Chair of the Young Fabians and served on the Executive of the Fabian Society and again became active in the London Labour Party, as Chair of Hornsey Constituency Labour Party.

He was elected to London Borough of Haringey Council, as its youngest member, in 1978 and remained a member for 24 years. For five years, he chaired the Council's Social Services Committee and was also Labour Group Chief Whip. From 1987 to 1999, he was Leader of the Council, having been elected during a turbulent period of the Council's history as its seventh Leader in seven and a half years. He had the task of stabilising the Council's finances and dealing with the multimillion-pound overspending under the Bernie Grant leadership. He also had to handle the restoration of Alexandra Palace and the debts incurred on it since Haringey had taken over its ownership from the Greater London Council in 1980.

One of the criticisms during his leadership was the expenses he incurred. Over the course of one year, his expenses were more than £24,000, including more than £15,000 spent on taxis.^{[3]} Although the District Auditor's investigation cleared him of any wrongdoing, it was critical of the flaws of the system, which meant that council members were never sent invoices for such expenses and so were not able to check the actual amount that the council was being charged.^{[4]}

In 1993, Labour Council Leaders in London elected Harris as Chair of the Association of London Authorities (ALA) and two years later he led the discussions which led to the merger of the ALA with the London Boroughs Association (which had previously comprised the Conservative and Liberal Democrat led Boroughs) to form the Association of London Government (now London Councils), which he then chaired until he stood down in 2000.

Harris was also active in the Association of Metropolitan Authorities, whose Social Services Committee he chaired, leading the negotiations with central government on the introduction of Care in the Community and the Children Act. When the Local Government Association was formed in 1997, Harris chaired the Labour Group (until 2004).

Harris was an elected member of the London Assembly from 2000 to 2004 representing the Brent and Harrow constituency. He was the Leader of the Labour Group on the Assembly until he lost his seat at the 2004 Assembly election. He was the first chairman of the Metropolitan Police Authority Metropolitan Police Authority from 2000 to 2004, overseeing the introduction of police community support officers and neighbourhood policing.

== Public appointments ==
After losing his seat on the London Assembly in 2004, the Home Secretary, David Blunkett, appointed him as the Home Secretary's representative on the Metropolitan Police Authority with responsibility for overseeing the work of the Metropolitan Police in countering terrorism and in security.

Harris also chaired the Independent Advisory Group on Deaths in Custody that reports to the Ministry of Justice, the Home Office and the Department of Health from 2009 to 2015.

He has also chaired National Trading Standards which delivers national and regional consumer protection enforcement since 2013 and the Independent Reference Group of the National Crime Agency since 2017.

He is a former Board member of the London Ambulance Service and Transport for London. He was a member of the European Committee of the Regions from 1994 to 2002.

== Parliamentary activities ==
Harris was appointed by Tony Blair as a life peer on 5 August 1998 as Baron Harris of Haringey, of Hornsey in the London Borough of Haringey taking his seat in October 1998 as a Labour member. He has been Chair of the Labour Peers’ Group since 2012 (having been vice-chair from 2008 until 2012).

In Parliament, he sits on the Joint Committee on the National Security Strategy and is Chair of the All-Party Parliamentary Group on Policing. He was Chair of the House of Lords Committee on the Legacy of the 2012 Olympic and Paralympic Games and was also a member of the Lords’ Committee on Personal Internet Security.

== Reviews and inquiry reports ==
In 2014, the then Minister for Prisons asked Harris to lead an independent review into the self-inflicted deaths of 87 young people in prison. This was published the following year as the Harris Review: Changing Prisons, Saving Lives and was the most substantial review of penal policy for a generation whose publication was hailed as “a watershed moment” by campaigners.

In 2016, Sadiq Khan as newly elected Mayor of London commissioned Harris to conduct an independent review into London's Preparedness to Respond to a Major Terrorist Incident. Most of the recommendations of his review were accepted, although not all had been implemented by the time of the terrorist attacks in London in 2017.

== Charitable activities ==
Harris also chaired the Freedom Charity, which educates young people about forced marriage and intervenes to prevent girls being forced to marry against their will, from 2009 to 2014.

Harris chaired the Wembley National Stadium Trust from 1995 until 2018. The Trust successfully led the bid for lottery funding to enable the national stadium to be rebuilt at Wembley and once the new stadium had reopened it began to distribute 1% of the Stadium's annual turnover to support community sports activities.

He was also at various times a Trustee of the Safer London Foundation, the Evening Standard Blitz Memorial Trust, the Help for Health Trust and Bilimankhwe Arts.

He was a Director of the not-for-profit Cyber Security Challenge UK.

Since January 2019, he has been Chair of the Fundraising Regulator.

Orders of precedence in the United Kingdom
Preceded by The Lord Bragg	Gentlemen; Baron Harris of Haringey	Followed by The Lord Macdonald of Tradeston
