= Staller (title) =

Staller (Old English: stallere or steallere) was a title used in late Anglo-Saxon England for high-ranking officials in the royal household. It was first used in the 11th century but fell out of use after the Norman Conquest.

== Etymology ==
Its origin, and exact meaning, are disputed. One suggestion is it derives from the Latin comes stabuli ('Count of the Stable'), a title used in the Byzantine Empire and later adopted by the Franks.

Laurence M. Larson argued it derived from Old Norse stallari and was introduced into England by Cnut the Great (r. 1016–1035). Ann Williams agrees it was Scandinavian in origin. It possibly indicated someone with a seat (steall) in the king's hall, in other words, an official within the royal household. In Latin texts, stallers were referred to as regis aulicus ('man of the king's hall') or regis palatinus ('man of the royal palatium').

== Role ==
Williams argues that similar officials existed before the 11th century. In the late 10th century, the title pedisecus ('one who sits at the feet of') appears in the records. The name suggests a person who is especially close to the king.

The first confirmed occurrence of staller in England was by Edward the Confessor (r. 1042–1066), who used it for senior members of his personal household. Their duties appear to have been flexible. Ralph the Staller and Ansgar the Staller are listed as royal stewards in a forged diploma of 1060. They, along with Robert FitzWimarc and Bondi the Staller, are identified as procuratores in an authentic 1065 diploma. Bondi likely performed some service related to royal hunting because he is titled forestarius in Domesday Book. The stallers also performed a military function and probably supervised the housecarls (royal bodyguards).

== Office-holders ==
- Ansgar the Staller (fl. 1044–1066)
- Bondi the Staller (fl. 1065)
- Eadnoth the Constable (died 1068), also known as Eadnoth the Staller, Anglo-Saxon landowner and steward to kings Edward the Confessor and Harold Godwinson
- Osgod Clapa, London
- Ralph the Staller (1011–1068)
- Robert FitzWimarc (died before 1075), also known as Robert the Staller
- Tovi Pruda (fl. 1018–1043)
