= Bondi the Staller =

Anglo-Danish landowner and thegn

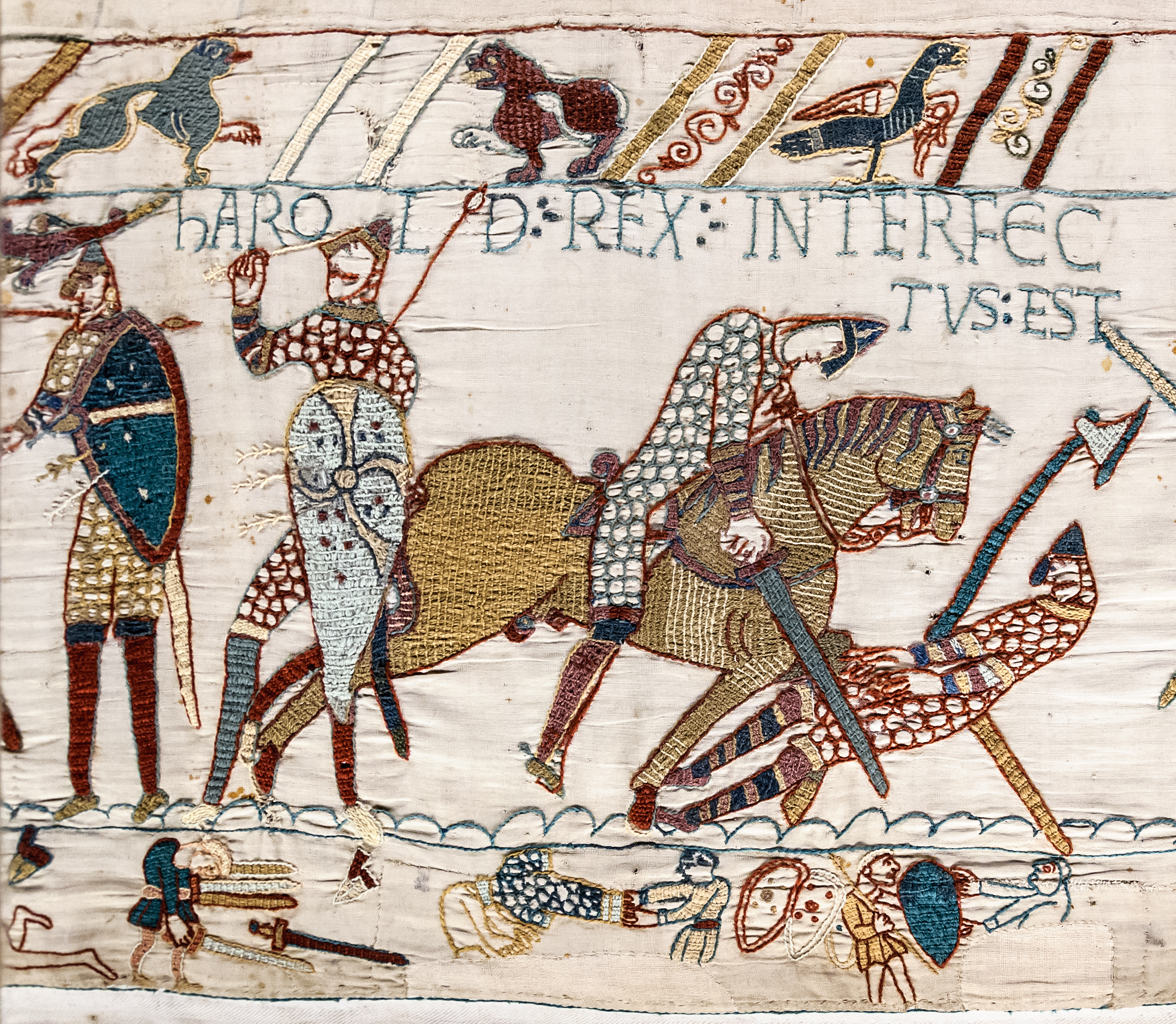
- Death of Harold at Hastings, October 1066

Staller
- In office 1058 (assumed) – 1066
- Monarchs: Edward the Confessor; Harold Godwinson; William the Conqueror

High Sheriff of Bedfordshire
- In office Unknown–1066

Staller
- In office 1060–1066

Personal details
- Born: circa 1024–1030 Unknown
- Died: After 1068 Unknown
- Occupation: Royal retainer, landowner

Bondi the Staller, also known as 'Boding', was a wealthy Anglo-Danish landowner, thegn, and member of Edward the Confessor's personal household.

His family were of Danish origin and held extensive estates in Wessex, as well as Perivale and Northolt in North-West London. In 1058 Edward the Confessor also made him a staller, a term of uncertain origin, used for senior officials in his personal household.

After Edward's death in January 1066, Bondi was kept on as a royal retainer by Harold Godwinson, then William the Conqueror, but gradually lost his positions and estates. He disappears from the historical record after 1068.

== Biography ==
His family is thought to have come from Mercia, though like many of the 'Anglo-Saxon' nobility, the name indicates he was originally of Danish origin.

Based on the Domesday Book of 1086, Bondi is thought to have owned estates in Berkshire, Buckinghamshire, and throughout East Anglia. This made him one of the richest landowners in England.

== Career ==
There are few details available on his life, apart from his appointment as staller, a title used for Edward's senior household officials, whose origin, and exact meaning, is disputed. It was essentially a different term for existing positions; in a document dating 1062, Bondi is described as palatius or palace official. Their roles often varied; in a charter of 1065, he is referenced as a procurator, in Domesday, he is called forestarius, a title equivalent to Master of the Hunt.

While not extensive, his lands in Berkshire made him part of a group of powerful royal nobles around Edward, including fellow staller Eadnoth, and Ansgar. He may have been High Sheriff of Bedfordshire for a time. He also attended shire courts as the king's representative, and the few details that survive derive from his signature on legal documents.

His activities after the death of Edward in January 1066, and the crowning of William the Conqueror in December are unclear. After the death of Harold Godwinson at Hastings in October, 15 year-old Edgar Ætheling was elected king by the Witenagemot; in early December, his principal backer, Edwin, Earl of Mercia, switched sides, and William became king on 15 December.

Bondi was one of Edward's officials initially retained by William to help administer his new kingdom, suggesting he was among those who submitted early. However, William gradually focused land holding among a small group of Normans; sometime around 1068, Bondi's estates at Earls Barton were transferred to Waltheof, Earl of Northumbria, and husband of Judith of Lens, William's niece. His other lands appear to have been granted by William to Henry de Ferrers.

== Sources ==
- Barlow, Frank (2011). Edward the Confessor. The Yale English Monarchs Series. Yale University Press. ISBN 978-0300072082.
- "Constable, or Staller". Hull Domesday Project.
- Green, Judith (1997). The Aristocracy of Norman England. Cambridge University Press. ISBN 978-0521335096.
- Lewis, C. P. (2015). "Danish Landowners in Wessex, 1066". Danes in Wessex: The Scandinavian Impact on Southern England, c. 800 – c. 1100. Oxbow Press. ISBN 978-1782979319.
- Mills, Peter (1996). "The Battle of London 1066". London Archaeologist. 8 (3).
- Olesen, Tryggvi Julius (1955). The Witenagemot in the Reign of Edward the Confessor: A Study in the Constitutional History of Eleventh-century England. Oxford University Press.
- Rex, Peter (2014). The English Resistance: The Underground War Against the Normans. Amberley. ISBN 978-1445604794.
- Seneca, Christine (2001). "Keeping up with the Godswinesons; In Pursuit of Aristocratic Status in Late Anglo-Saxon England". Anglo-Norman Studies XXIII: Proceedings of the Battle Conference 2000. Boydell Press. ISBN 978-0851158259.
- Williams, Ann (2008). The World Before Domesday: The English Aristocracy 900-1066. Continuum. ISBN 978-1847252395.
- Williams, Ann (1995). The English and the Norman Conquest. Boydell Press. ISBN 978-0851155883.
