= London Bridge (natural arch) =

Natural coastal arch in Torquay, Devon

- Rock arch
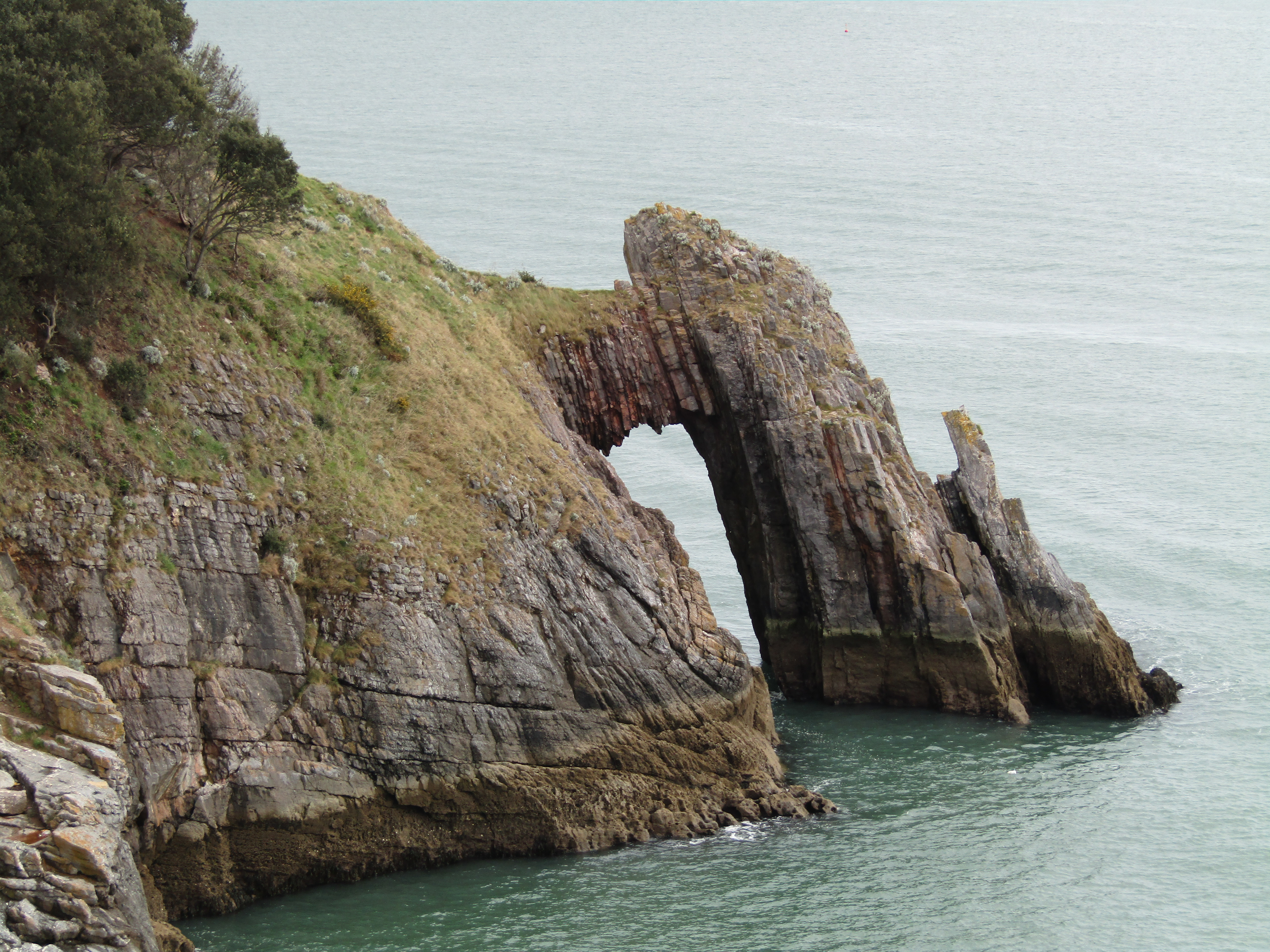
- London Bridge

- Location within Devon
- Coordinates: 50.45423°N 3.51865°W
- Location: Torquay, Devon, England
- Formed by: Coastal erosion
- Geology: Middle Devonian limestone

London Bridge is a natural arch on the coast of Torquay in Devon, England.

== Etymology ==
London Bridge has been so called for centuries.

In 1832, the writer Octavian Blewitt wrote in his Panorama of Torquay that London Bridge was an “absurd appellation”.

== Description ==
London Bridge is situated to the East of Torquay, beside an abandoned limestone quarry, and below the South West Coast Path. It can be reached by a short diversion from the trail which leads down to the arch through woodland. London Bridge can also be seen from a viewpoint above the abandoned Dyer's Quarry on the coast path, and from numerous locations around Torquay.

== History ==
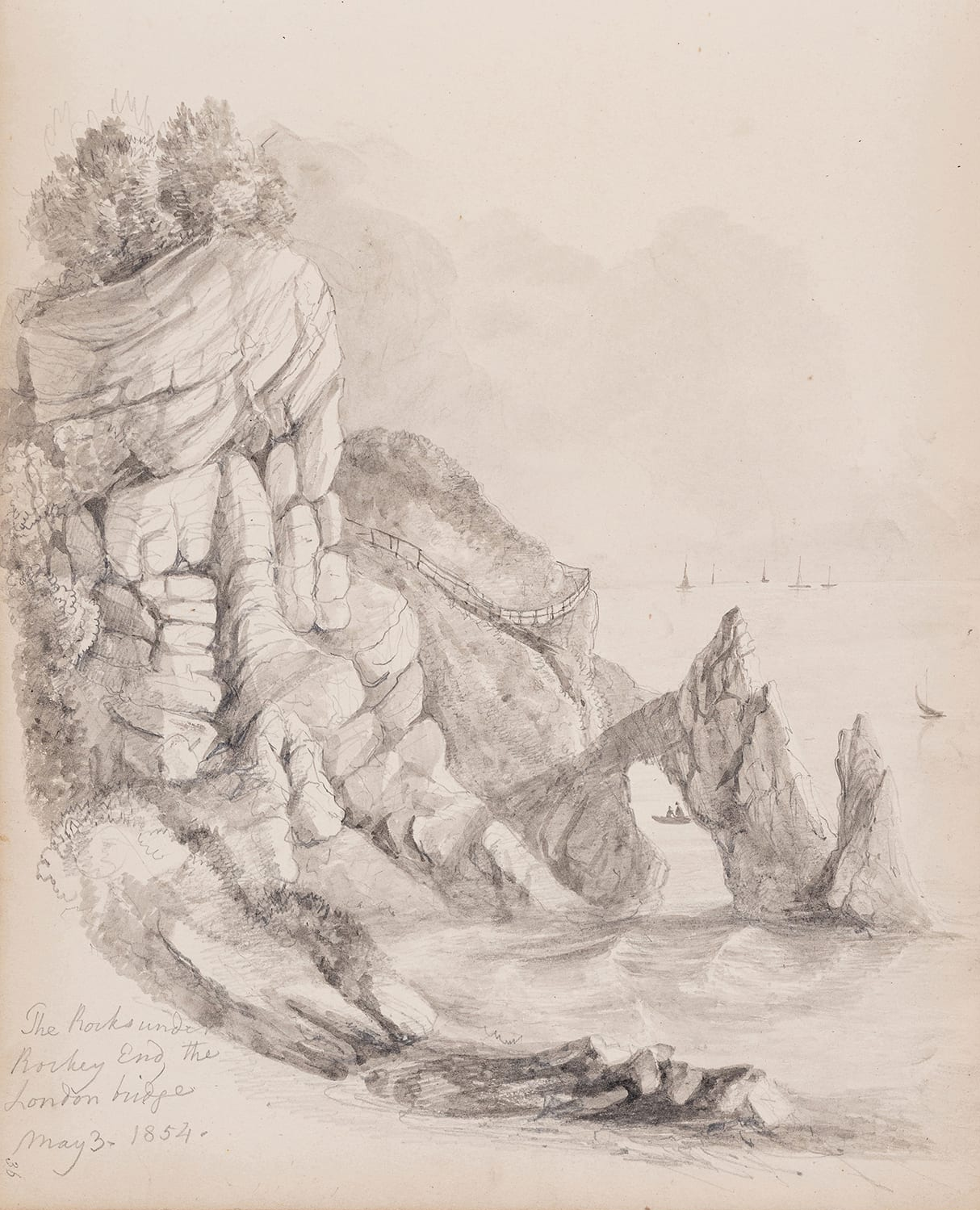
An 1854 drawing of the arch, by Richenda Gurney

The arch was popular with visitors in the past, particularly in the 19th century. During that period and thereafter it has been depicted in numerous works of art.

== Recreation ==
London Bridge is a popular climbing crag, and is a well-known venue for deep water soloing.

The arch and the area in the vicinity including the long abandoned Dyer's Quarry is a location well-liked for coasteering, due to its secluded location close to Torquay, and there are many possible jumps, some of which are said to be the best in the area.

There is also a scuba diving spot nearby, called 'The Pipes', which is so named as there is a collection of pipes spilled from the wreck of a barge which rests nearby on the seabed. It is noted to be an ideal site for trainee divers.

Ballan wrasse, conger eel and other fish are also in abundance near the arch and fishing hobbyists take advantage of this.
