= London Bridge attack =

London Bridge attack can refer to:

- Burning of Southwark, 1066 attempt by Normans to seize the bridge
- 1884 London Bridge attack
- 1992 London Bridge bombing
- 2017 London Bridge attack
- 2019 London Bridge stabbing
