= Burning of Southwark =

Battle in England in 1066

- Part of the Norman Conquest
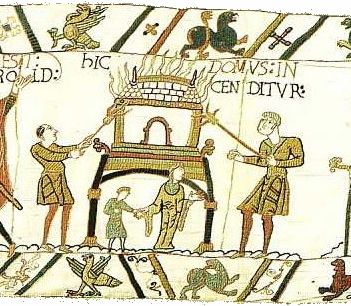
- A scene from the Bayeux Tapestry depicting the (earlier) burning of an Anglo-Saxon house
| Date | Mid–October 1066 |
| Location | Southwark, England |
| Result | Norman retreat |

Belligerents
| Duchy of Normandy | Kingdom of England |

Commanders and leaders
| Duke William of Normandy | Ansgar the Staller |

Strength
| 500 cavalry | |

The Burning of Southwark was a battle fought in Southwark during the Norman Conquest of England in October 1066.

The Norman soldiers of William, Duke of Normandy fought with Anglo-Saxon soldiers in Southwark for control of London Bridge, crossing the River Thames to the English capital London. The Normans defeated the Anglo-Saxons in the battle but withdrew from Southwark due to strong local resistance, setting fire to the town during their retreat to spread terror. Southwark was destroyed and William marched westwards and cut off Anglo-Saxon supply routes to London, which led to the city submitting to his rule.

== Background ==
Map of key events in the Norman Conquest

William, Duke of Normandy, had launched his invasion of the Kingdom of England in late September 1066, declaring his claim to the English throne following the death of the childless Anglo-Saxon King Edward the Confessor, the son of his great-aunt Emma of Normandy. Edward's death in January 1066 saw his brother-in-law Harold Godwinson proclaimed king by the Anglo-Saxon Witenagemot, but still resulted in a violent succession crisis contested by his brother Tostig Godwinson, the King of Norway Harald Hardrada, and Ælfgar, Earl of Mercia's sons Morcar and Ēadwine. Harold had defeated his other opponents by 25 September, leaving William's invasion on 28 September his only remaining threat.

On 14 October, William defeated an English force at the Battle of Hastings and killed Harold, then moved to secure the English capital at London, where Edgar Ætheling had been proclaimed king by the Witenagemot. Expecting little resistance, William sent a small force of cavalry to the strategic town of Southwark to secure the southern end of London Bridge, which provided a crossing of the River Thames and direct access to London. At the time, Southwark was a partially-fortified suburb town of London and formed part of the personal estate of Godwinson's family.

== Battle ==
Some of London's population supported William but many resisted the Norman invaders, with the local Anglo-Saxon forces led by Ansgar (or Esegar) the "Staller" (Royal standard bearer) and sheriff of Middlesex. Ansgar had been wounded whilst leading a contingent of Londoners for Harold at the Battle of Hastings, but had returned to the city with a number of other Anglo-Saxon leaders to organise a defence against William. Although Ansgar's wounds were so severe that he was not capable of walking and had to be carried in a litter, he seems to have mustered a force by that season's third raising of the fyrd, and his troops were described as "numerous and formidable". William made an offer to Ansgar that he could retain his estates and position as sheriff and join William's council if he recognised him as king. Ansgar refused to accept the terms and led a number of London citizenry against the Norman force at Southwark: Edwin, Earl of Mercia, Morcar, Earl of Northumbria and Ealdred, Archbishop of York may possibly have been amongst the defenders. The 500 Norman knights defeated the Anglo-Saxon force and reached London Bridge but, shocked at the fierce defence put up by the defenders, they were unable to hold the structure and soon withdrew. The town of Southwark was set ablaze by the Normans as they withdrew to spread terror amongst the inhabitants of London across the river. Almost the entire town was destroyed, including the Southwark mint, which did not recover its former levels of production until the late 1080s.

== Aftermath ==
William postponed his attempt to directly storm London as a result of the defence made at Southwark. The Norman probing force reunited with the main army which began a circuitous march around the west of London. This country was strongly anti-Norman and William found many of the Thames crossings defended, avoiding Reading and reached Wallingford where he crossed the river after securing the support of Saxon thegn Wigod. William then split his forces into two divisions; leading one personally northwards via Wendover to Berkhamsted with the other marching via Sonning, Wargrave, Maidenhead and Chalfont St Peter.

William's forces cut off the supply routes to London from the rest of the Anglo-Saxon kingdom and, together with the burning of Southwark and the Duke's negotiation with the county of Kent, led to the submission of the city. William had been in contact with leading clergymen in the English capital to persuade them to support his cause, and it seems that they were successful in influencing the Anglo-Saxon leaders of the city who travelled to Berkhamsted to pledge their loyalty to William and deliver him the keys to the city gates. William entered the city peacefully and was crowned King of England at Westminster Abbey on Christmas Day.
