= 2017 London attack =

2017 London attack may refer to any of four separate events:

- The 2017 Westminster attack on 22 March
- The 2017 London Bridge attack on 3 June
- The Finsbury Park attack on 19 June
- The Parsons Green bombing on 15 September
