= Ralph the Staller =

Staller, Constable, Earl

Earl

Personal details
- Died: 1069
- Children: Ralph de Gael
- Profession: Noble, constable, thane

Ralph the Staller or Ralf the Englishman (died 1069/70), was a noble and landowner in both Anglo-Saxon and post-Conquest England. He first appears in charters from Brittany, where he was described as Ralph / Ralf the Englishman, and it was in Brittany that his son Ralph de Gaël held a large hereditary lordship.

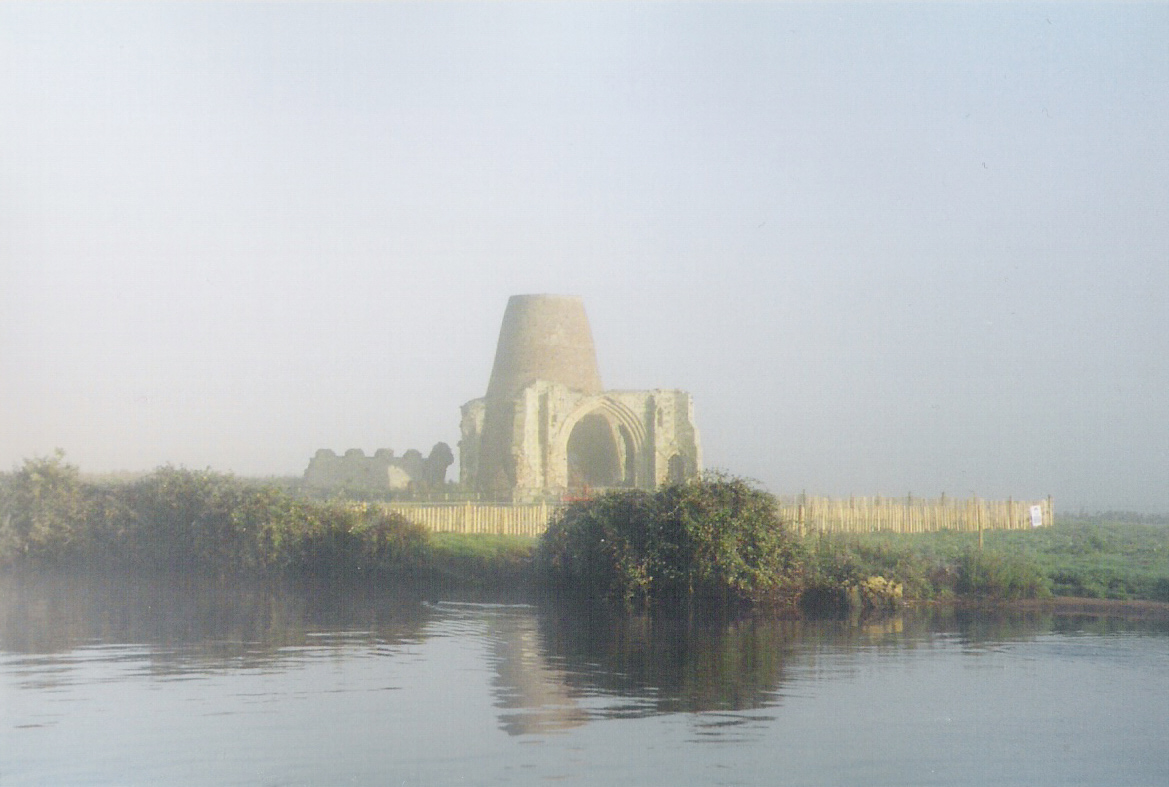
St Benet's Abbey, Norfolk

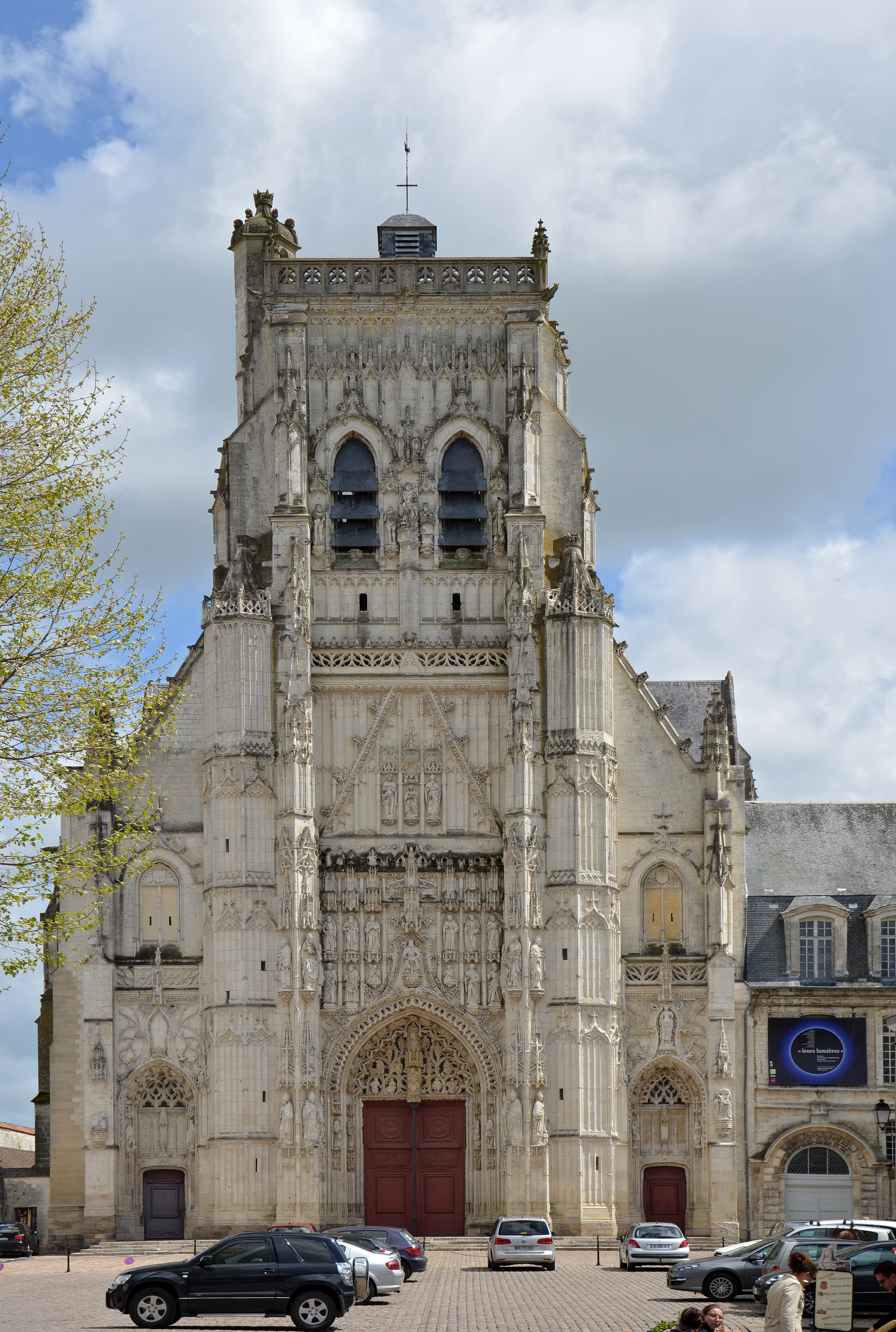
Abbaye-de-Saint-Riquier-DSC 0307

The exact nature of Ralph's connections to England and Brittany are uncertain. Although he was clearly present in England before 1066, his name Ralph (Radulphus, Ralf, Rauf, Raoul etc.) was continental, and not English. The Anglo-Saxon Chronicle contrasts him with his unnamed wife (whom it describes as a Breton), saying that he was born in Norfolk. On the other hand, both the Norman writer William of Malmesbury and the chronicle of the abbey of Saint-Riquier in France (where he made a grant), describe Ralph the Staller as a Breton. Modern historians such as Ann Williams have suggested that Ralph's father came to England with Emma of Normandy when she married Aethelred II in 1002. She suggest that his mother was English, thus accounting for relatives with Anglo-Saxon names, mentioned in Domesday Book.

Ralph was part of the court of Edward the Confessor, and is sometimes referred to as "squire," a generic title for important members of the royal court at the time. He is also designated as a seneschal and courtier. He held the military post of staller, a position roughly equivalent to the continental constable, under King Edward the Confessor.

Ralph is recorded as a witness to charters, for instance in 1053, as a staller. From 1053 to 1055, he attested a charter between Earl Leofric and Godiva, which endowed a monastery at Stowe, St Mary in Lincolnshire. Ralph also acted as a patron to the Abbey of Saint-Riquier in county Ponthieu and the Abbey of St Benet de Holme in Norfolk.

Ralph survived partaking in the Conquest of 1066 and gained the favour of William the Conqueror, who made him Earl of East Anglia. He married and had several children, including his heir, Ralph Guader, who succeeded to his earldom and Hardouin (French) or Hardwin (in English). He is also believed to have been related to Hereward the Wake, who had connections with Peterborough Abbey in Norfolk and to Abbot Brand.
