= 1973 Westminster bombing =

Car bomb explosion in Millbank, London

- Part of the Troubles
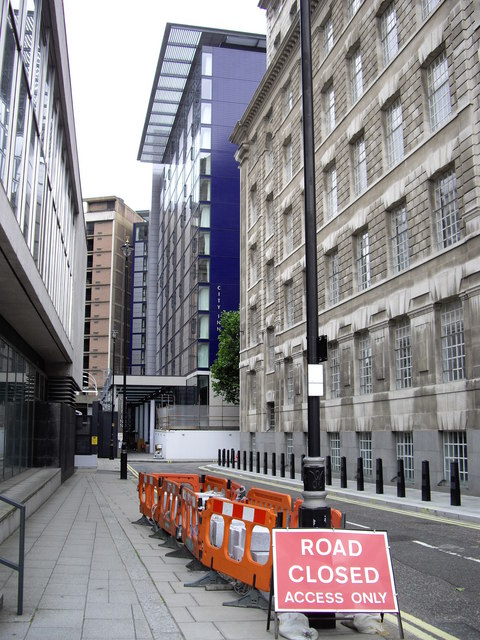
- Thorney Street, looking south from the location of the blast
- Location: 51°29′38.36″N 0°7′33.94″W; City of Westminster, London, United Kingdom
- Date: 18 December 1973; 08:50 (UTC)
- Attack type: Car bomb
- Deaths: 0
- Injuries: 60
- Perpetrator: Provisional Irish Republican Army

The 1973 Westminster bombing was a car bomb that exploded on Thorney Street, off Horseferry Road, in Millbank, London on 18 December 1973. The explosion injured up to 60 people. The bomb was planted in a stolen car parked in front of the Home Office building when it exploded on Tuesday morning. Two telephone warnings were given within half an hour before the blast. The Provisional Irish Republican Army (IRA) was responsible for the attack, which was assumed to have been in retaliation for the jailing of the Provisional IRA Belfast Brigade members who bombed the Old Bailey earlier in the year. A day earlier, the IRA sent two parcel bombs that targeted two politicians.

It was one of many IRA car bombings in Northern Ireland and England during the Troubles.

== Aftermath ==
In the week following the Westminster car bomb, several more IRA bombs exploded in London. The day after the Westminster bombing on 19 December, one person was injured when an IRA letterbomb exploded at a London postal sorting office. Five days later on Christmas Eve 1973, the IRA bombed two London pubs, first the North Star public house, where six people were injured & the second at the Swiss Cottage Tavern, in which an unspecified number of people were injured. The last bombs exploded on Boxing Day 1973 when the Stage Door public house was bombed injuring one person, on the same day another bomb exploded at Sloane Square station there were no injuries in this attack.

== See also ==
- Chronology of Provisional Irish Republican Army actions (1970–79)
