= 2007 London car bombs =

Averted terrorist attack

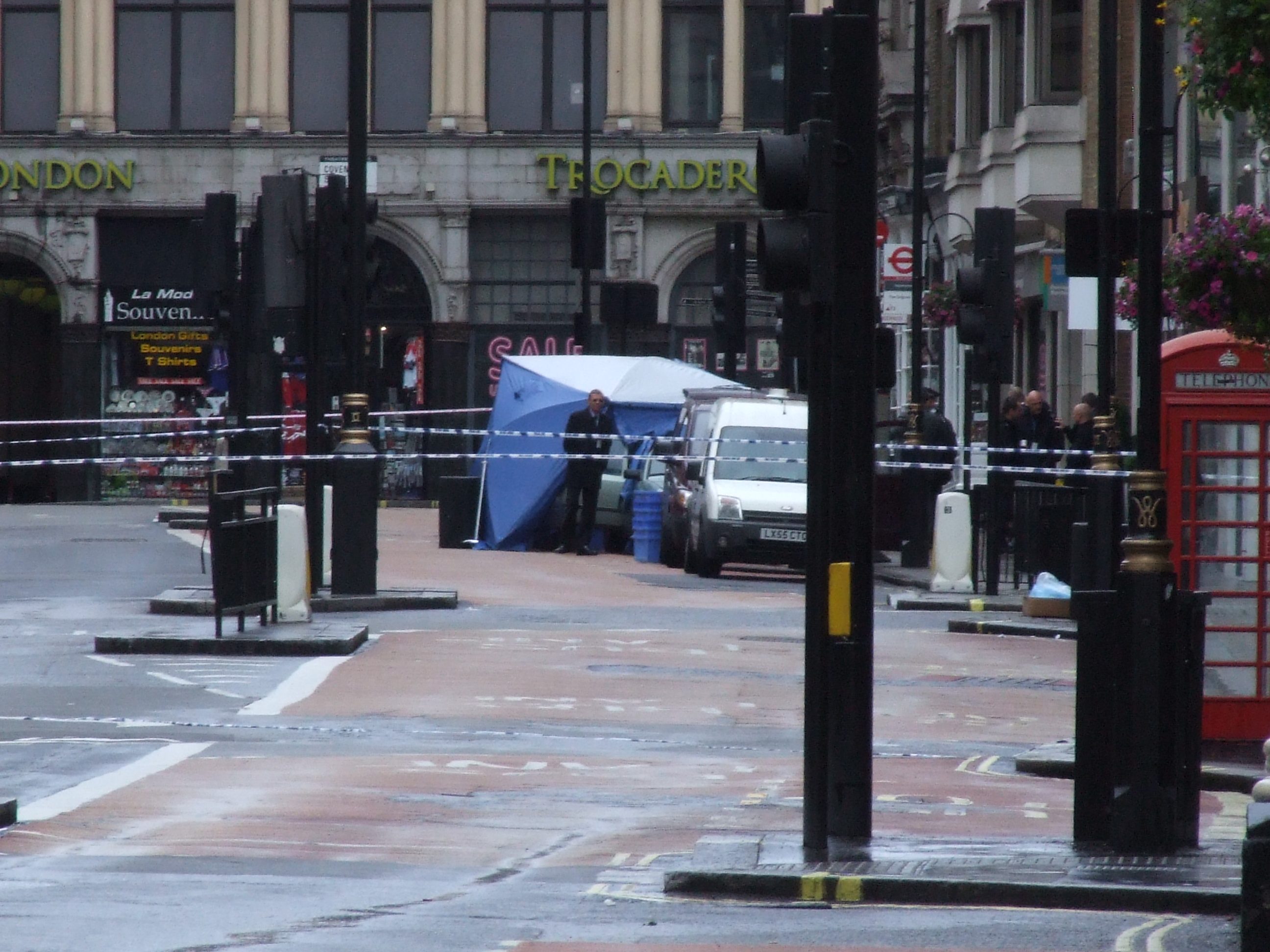
- The Mercedes-Benz on Haymarket covered by a tent
- Location: London, England
- Date: 29 June 2007; 19 years ago
- Target: Haymarket and Park Lane
- Attack type: Attempted car bombing, attempted mass murder
- Weapon: Car bomb
- Deaths: 0
- Injuries: 0
- Perpetrators: Bilal Abdullah and Kafeel Ahmed
- Motive: Islamic terrorist attack

On 29 June 2007, two car bombs in London were discovered and disabled before they could be detonated. The first device was left near the Tiger Tiger nightclub in Haymarket at around 01:30, and the second was left in Cockspur Street, located in close proximity to the nightclub.

The first car bomb was reported to the police by the door staff of Tiger Tiger. About an hour later, the second car bomb was ticketed for illegal parking, and an hour after that, transported to the car pound at Park Lane, where staff noticed a strong smell of petrol and reported the vehicle to police when they heard about the first device.

The event coincided with the appointment of Gordon Brown as Prime Minister two days earlier, but Downing Street dismissed suggestions of a connection. A close link was quickly established to the Glasgow Airport attack the following day. Bilal Abdullah, arrested following the Glasgow attack, was later found guilty of conspiracy to commit murder in relation to both incidents and sentenced to life imprisonment, with a minimum of 32 years in prison. His co-conspirator, Kafeel Ahmed, died of injuries sustained in the failed Glasgow attack.

== Discovery of car bombs ==
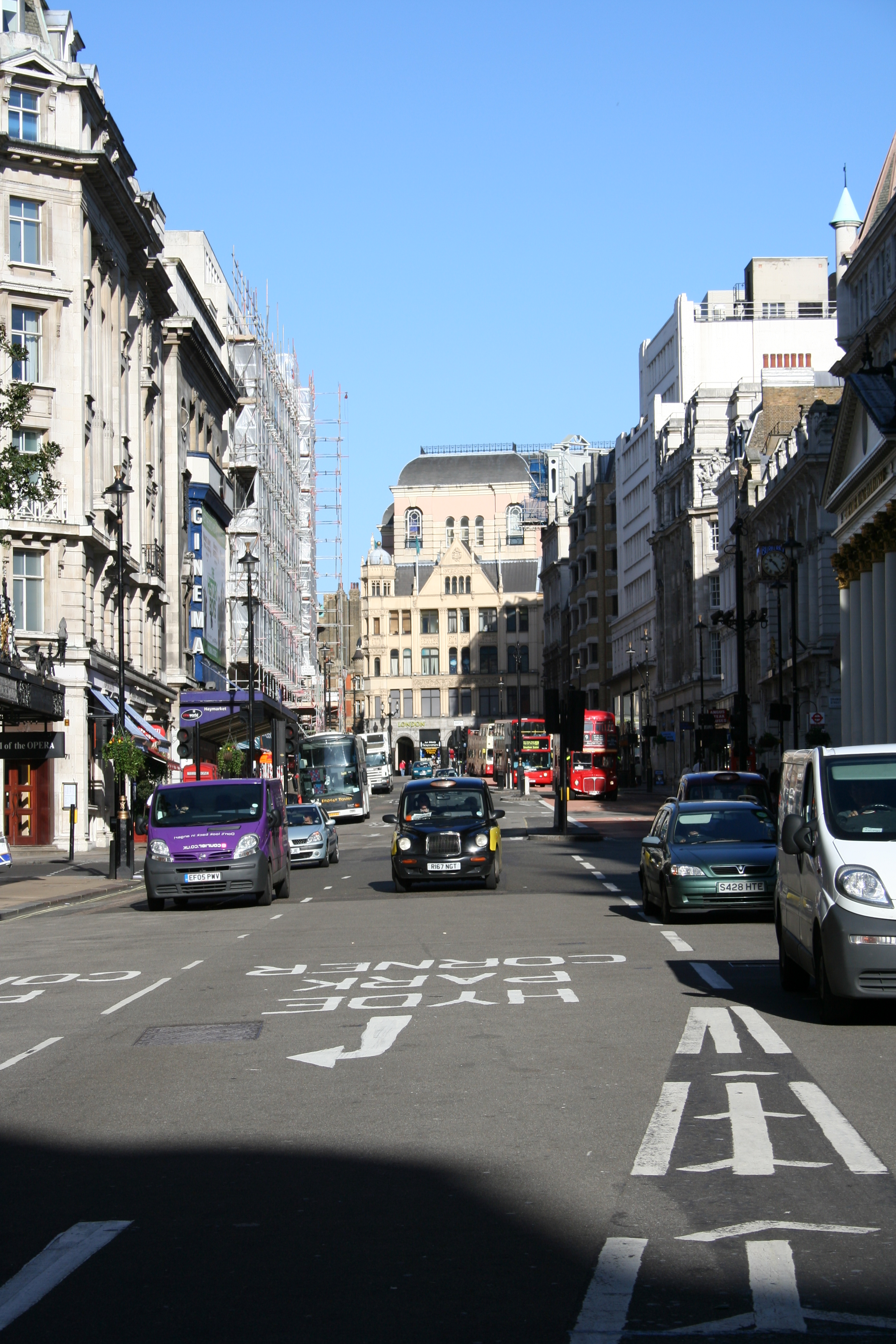
Haymarket

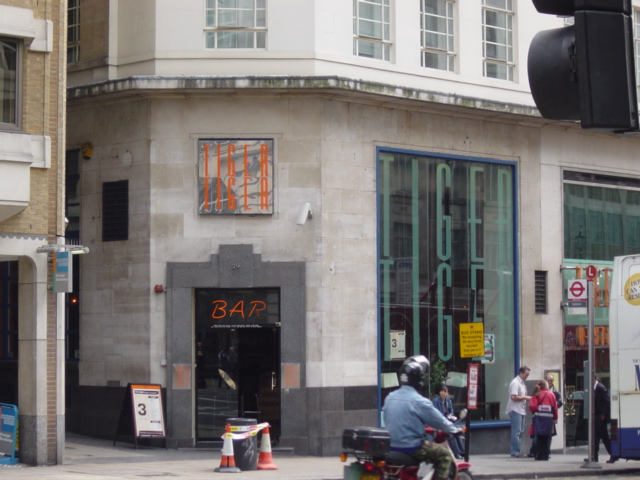
Tiger Tiger nightclub in Haymarket

A bomb was reported to the police by the door staff of the Tiger Tiger nightclub in Haymarket. At the time, an ambulance crew was attending to a minor incident at the nightclub when they noticed suspicious fumes coming from a vehicle. The vehicle was reported to have contained liters of petrol, gas cylinders, and nails. Scotland Yard reported that while the gas contained in the canisters and the quantity of the canisters remained unknown, further details would be given after analysis by forensic experts. The head of Scotland Yard's counter-terrorism command said, "It is obvious that if the device had detonated there could have been serious injury or loss of life." According to Sky News, the gas cylinders contained propane.

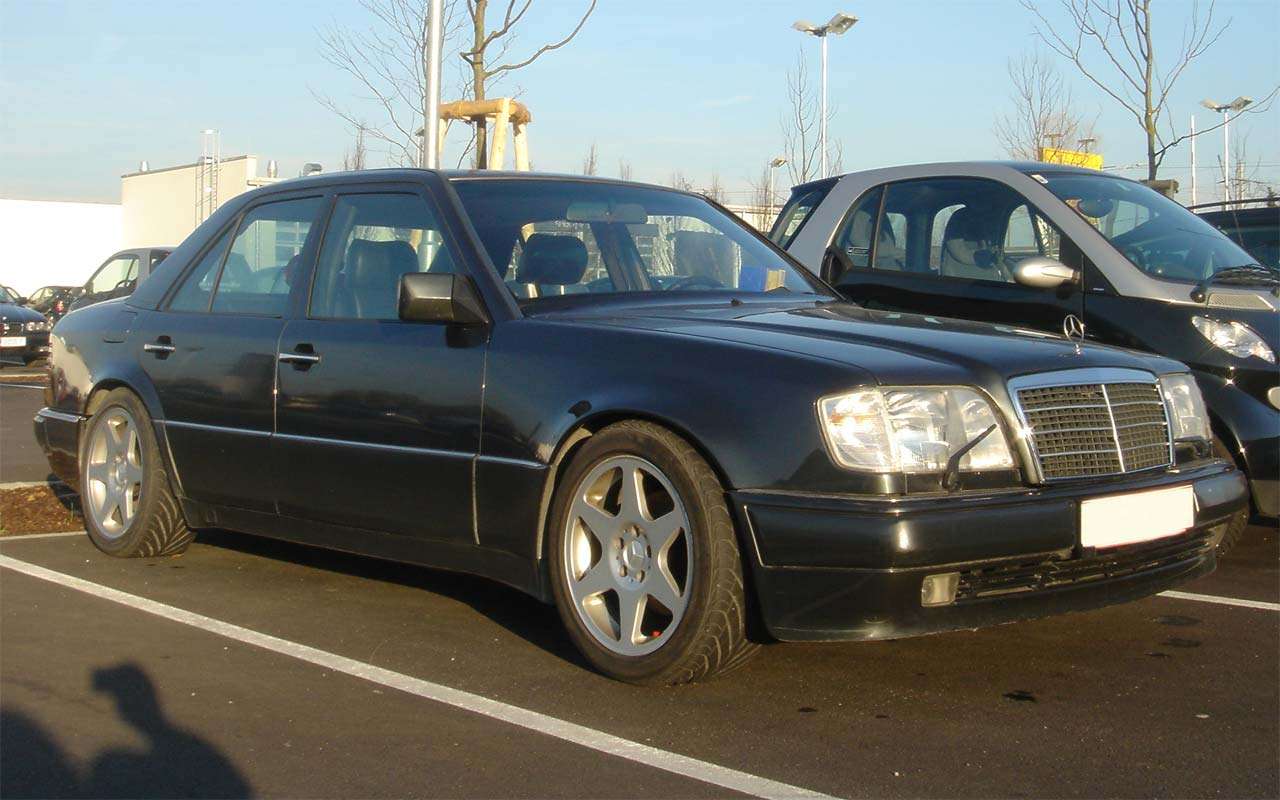
A Mercedes-Benz W124, similar to the car involved in the bombing.

A second car bomb was believed to have been left in the same area at around the same time. The vehicle received a parking ticket in Cockspur Street at 02:30. At about 03:30, it was transported to the Park Lane car pound. However, staff left the vehicle in a public area after smelling petrol fumes, and they then alerted police upon hearing about the discovery of the bomb at Tiger Tiger.

Both vehicles were made by Mercedes-Benz. The first was a light-green metallic Mercedes-Benz W124 saloon, registration number G824 VFK. The second was a blue Mercedes-Benz 280E. The cars and their devices were recovered intact for forensic examination, and both were found to contain petrol cans, gas canisters, and a quantity of nails, with a mobile phone-based trigger.

== Suspects ==
Bilal Abdullah and Kafeel Ahmed were identified as the main suspects behind the London car bombs and the subsequent Glasgow attack. Abdullah was charged with conspiracy to cause explosions, while Ahmed was hospitalized at the Glasgow Royal Infirmary in critical condition after he suffered severe burns to 90% of his body. He was not expected to survive—he had already been revived twice as of 4 July. A suicide note left behind indicates that they intended to die in the attack.

On 2 August 2007, Strathclyde Police reported that Ahmed had died in the Glasgow Royal Infirmary. His last rituals were held in the UK. On 17 December 2009, Abdullah was convicted at Woolwich Crown Court of conspiracy to murder for the incidents in both London and Glasgow and sentenced to life imprisonment with a requirement that he spend at least 32 years in jail.

Investigations were being carried out to unearth Abdullah and Ahmed's possible involvement with the deadly 2005 Indian Institute of Science shooting, an attack by unknown suspects still at large.

== Timeline ==
Local time (GMT+1)	Event
29 June 2007
01:25	London Ambulance Service crew report seeing smoke in a car parked in Haymarket. Eyewitnesses claim to have seen the car being driven "erratically" and then crashing into bins, after which the driver got out and ran off.
02:00	Metropolitan Police officers investigate the vehicle and cordon off the area.
02:30	A second car is found illegally parked in Cockspur Street, near Trafalgar Square.
03:30	The second car is taken to a car pound in Park Lane. Police manually disable a device in the first car.
04:00	A witness sees the police removing gas canisters from the car.
08:00	Piccadilly Circus Underground station is closed.
10:25	The car is taken from Haymarket and sent to the Defence Science and Technology Laboratory's research site at Fort Halstead in Kent.
10:30	The COBR committee meets to discuss the issue. Piccadilly Circus Underground station is reopened.
14:30	Park Lane is closed off after a second suspect vehicle is discovered in an underground car park.
15:45	A police bomb investigation robot is seen near the entrance to the car park.
17:00	Police cordon off Fleet Street after finding a third suspicious vehicle.
18:00	Fleet Street re-opens after nothing is found in the vehicle.
19:00	Police confirm that a second device has been located at the Park Lane site.
20:45	Police confirm that both vehicles were packed with nails, petrol and gas cylinders.

== Aftermath ==
A spokesperson for Pride London stated that the route of their Gay Pride march, set for 30 June 2007, would be unchanged, although extra precautions such as removing bins would be implemented. The police do not think the attacks were targeted at the event. Other suspicious vehicles in Park Lane and Fleet Street were investigated by police, as well as reports of suspicious cars in other areas of the UK, such as Warrington, which suffered a 1993 bomb attack by the Provisional Irish Republican Army.

Office workers, students and tourists were still enjoying a Friday night out in London only hours after the discovery of the bombs. Bars and clubs remained open, and London mayor Ken Livingstone urged the capital's communities to work together to defeat the terrorism threat.

Security at Wimbledon was increased as a result of the incident. Whitehall sources later stated that "international elements" were believed to be involved with the bomb. It was reported that police had a "crystal clear" picture of the driver of the first car and suspect he may be an individual formerly detained in relation to the case of convicted terrorist Dhiren Barot. Barot was connected to an earlier "limousine bomb" plot, which also involved cars packed with propane gas cylinders.

CBS News reported that a message appeared on the widely used jihadist Internet forum Al-Hesbah at 08:09, 28 June 2007, stating: "Today I say: Rejoice, by Allah, London shall be bombed." The message went on to mention the recently announced knighthood of Satanic Verses author Salman Rushdie.

The following day, in another incident, a Jeep Cherokee was set on fire and driven into the main departure terminal of Glasgow Airport, causing minor damage. Two men, believed to be of Asian appearance, were arrested at the scene. One, who had been on fire, was taken to a nearby hospital, and the other to a police station. Home Secretary Jacqui Smith announced that the attack was being treated as a terrorist attack and that the United Kingdom terrorism threat level had been elevated from "Severe" to "Critical," meaning "further attacks are expected imminently." In a press conference, Glasgow police said this attack and the car bombs in London were believed to be linked. The BBC reported that a mobile phone found after the arrest of the Glasgow suspects contained the numbers of those involved in the London bombing attempts.

At approximately 21:30 on 30 June, officers of the Metropolitan Police and West Midlands Police arrested two people at junction 16 on the northbound M6 motorway near Sandbach in south Cheshire, blocking the motorway for about 40 minutes.

On 18 December, gallantry awards for two of the Metropolitan Police explosive officers involved in defusing the devices were gazetted. Paul Humphrey received the Queen's Gallantry Medal (the third highest such medal in the UK honors system), and Gary Anthony Wright received the Queen's Commendation for Bravery.

== See also ==
- 2001 Birmingham bombing
- 7 July 2005 London bombings
- 21 July 2005 London attempted bombings
