= Salman Rushdie knighthood controversy =

Islam-related controversy

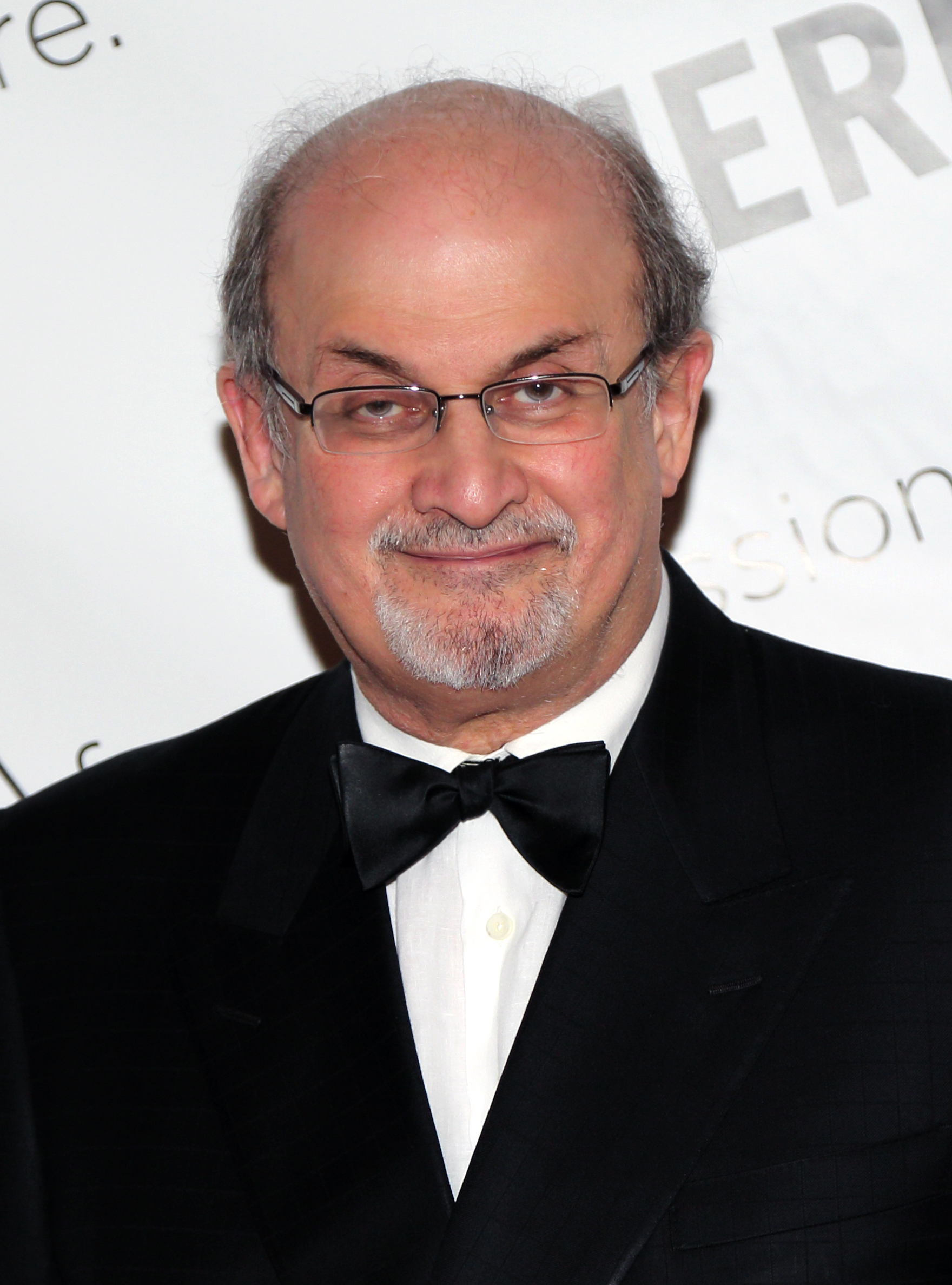
Sir Salman Rushdie, 2014

In mid-June 2007, Salman Rushdie, the British-Indian novelist and author of the novel The Satanic Verses, was created a Knight Bachelor by Queen Elizabeth II. Soon after the news of the knighthood was released protests against the honour were held in Malaysia and in Pakistan where effigies of the writer were publicly burnt. On 19 June 2007, governments in both Pakistan and Iran summoned their British ambassadors to officially protest against the award. While many groups and individuals renewed the call to execute Rushdie, the author stated that he "is not commenting on the latest threats to his life. It is understood he is anxious not to inflame the situation". When asked by the Associated Press if his silence was at the request of the British government, Rushdie replied by e-mail stating "The British authorities have not asked me to do or not do anything. I have simply chosen to remain out of this storm for the moment. And nobody is turning anything down." The media noted in July 2007 that Rushdie "has not been seen in public since the 16 June announcement of his knighthood." However, he was photographed receiving his knighthood formally the next year at a ceremony which, breaking with tradition, was not announced in advance of his attendance.

== Knighthood ==
Ribbon bar of the Knight Bachelor Medal

Rushdie was awarded a knighthood for services to literature in the Queen's Birthday Honours on 16 June 2007. He remarked, "I am thrilled and humbled to receive this great honour, and am very grateful that my work has been recognised in this way." His knighthood was part of the UK's twice a year honours ritual "designed to recognise outstanding achievement – is part of an ancient and complex honours system." Rushdie's award was concurrent with 946 honours which included 21 knighthoods. The knighthood list was determined by independent committees that vet nominations from the government and the public. The Queen and the Prime Minister only had a ceremonial role in approving them.

The arts and media committee (one of eight similar committees) proposed Rushdie's honour to the main committee who then forwarded it with others to the prime minister. The arts and media committee was chaired by investment banker and former chairman of the trustees of the National Gallery, Lord Rothschild. Its other members were "Jenny Abramsky, the BBC's director of radio and music; novelist and poet Ben Okri, who is vice-president of the English chapter of PEN International, which campaigns on behalf of writers who face persecution; Andreas Whittam Smith, former editor of the Independent; John Gross, the author and former theatre critic of the Sunday Telegraph; and two permanent secretaries, one from the Department for Culture, Media and Sport and one from the Scottish Government." Smith told reporters that the question of political outrage was not one they were authorised to examine, "Very properly, we were concerned only with merit in relation to the level of the award." All other aspects were for the main committee to examine. The British Foreign Office, which has a permanent secretary on the main committee, announced that there had been no requests to gauge possible Muslim reaction to the knighthood. It was noted that Rushdie's 13 books have won numerous awards, including the Booker Prize for Midnight's Children in 1981, the Booker of Bookers prize, the Whitbread novel award (twice), and the James Tait Black memorial prize.

PEN International had been a constant supporter of Rushdie being honoured, believing that awarding the author (born in India) would be "seen as a positive step in British-Asian relations." The director of their London chapter, Nathan Heawood said the group was shocked at the negative reaction, adding "The honour is for services to literature and a very belated recognition that he is a world writer, who was in the vanguard of a writing tradition that exploded in the 80s in South Asia. It seems a shame that a few lines in his fourth novel should have turned him into this hate figure. He has become a Guy Fawkes figure to be thrown on a bonfire whenever it suits a government to divert attention from what is happening in their own countries."

In response to criticism of the award by some foreign nations, the British Government stated that Rushdie's honour recognises free speech and is part of their "desire to honour Muslims in the British community." British Home Secretary John Reid also defended the award, saying that the UK has "a set of values that accrues people honours for their contribution to literature even when they don't agree with our point of view. That's our way and that's what we stand by." Speaking about the reaction to The Satanic Verses Reid insisted that allowing such works was not a plot targeting Islam, saying "A lot of people were upset when John Cleese made Life of Brian. Others had been offended by Mel Gibson's 2004 film, The Passion of the Christ. ...[Britons] have a right to express opinions and a tolerance of other people's point of view, and we don't apologise for that." In a similar light, John Sutherland, emeritus professor of literature and former Booker prize judge, noted that Islam was not the only institution held up for criticism by Rushdie in his most controversial book. He pointed out that "For the writer of The Satanic Verses, which was extremely rude about England, it's certainly unusual [to be so honoured]."

Rushdie was ultimately knighted in an investiture ceremony on 25 June 2008 which formalised his standing as a Knight Bachelor.

== Iranian reaction ==
=== Ambassador summoned ===
On 19 June 2007, British Ambassador Geoffrey Adams, was summoned to appear before the Iranian Foreign Ministry where he was told by Foreign Ministry director Ebrahim Rahimpour that "This insulting, suspicious and improper act by the British government is an obvious example of fighting against Islam." The ministry also qualified the honour as rewarding "a hated apostate" and declared it Islamophobic. Ambassador Adams was told that the knighthood was seen as a "'provocative act' which angered one and a half billion Muslims worldwide." Adams insisted that "the honour was given for Rushdie's services for literature and should therefore not be regarded as insult."

=== Politicians protest ===
Also on the 19th, Mohammad Reza Bahonar vice speaker of the Majlis of Iran, told the nation's parliament that the knighthood "has hurt the feelings of more than 1.5 billion Muslims" and that "Salman Rushdie has turned into a hated corpse which cannot be resurrected by any action. The action by the British queen in knighting Salman Rushdie, the apostate, is an unwise one. The British monarch lives under this illusion that Britain is still a 19th-century superpower and that bestowing titles is something still deemed important." The Iranian Foreign Ministry spokesman Mohammad-Ali Hosseini told reporters that "Awarding a person who is one of the most hated figures in the Islamic world is a clear sign of the anti-Islamic stance of high-ranking British officials. ...[It proves desecration of Islamic values in the West] is totally organised and done with the support and under the direction of those countries."

On Sunday 24 June 2007 Gholamali Haddadadel, the Iranian speaker of parliament spoke against the honour on state television. He said "The latest act of the British government was shameless and imprudent and can not be interpreted to anything but blind hostility and absolute brainlessness. The Muslims of the world will not leave this imprudent and shameless act without response."

=== Death fatwa still in effect ===
After Friday prayer services on 22 June 2007, prominent cleric Hujjat al-Islam Ahmad Khatami spoke to worshipers by broadcast on state radio from Tehran. He addressed the death sentence issued by Ayatollah Ruhollah Khomeini against Rushdie, saying "In the Islamic Iran that revolutionary fatwa of Imam [Khomeini] is still alive and cannot be changed." He went on to say that "The old and decrepit government of Great Britain should know that the era of their empire is over and today they are a valet in the service of the United States." While in 1998 the Iranian government (under British diplomatic pressure) declared it would "neither support nor hinder assassination operations on Rushdie," many clerics like Khatami rejected the move. Even soon after the government's disavowal, the Iranian press reported three clerics calling on their followers to kill Rushdie, stating that the fatwa was irrevocable. As late as January 2005, Khomeini's successor, Ayatollah Ali Khamenei announced that "he still believed the British novelist was an apostate whose killing would be authorized by Islam."

Iranian newspapers have been covering the story extensively viewing both Rushdie and the British government in a negative light. One example is the Jomhuri Eslami newspaper which reflecting on Queen Elizabeth II said, "The question is what the old British crone sought by knighting Rushdie: to help him? Well, her act only shortens Rushdie's pathetic life."

On 25 June 2007, foreign ministry spokesman Mohammad Ali Hosseini was confronted by the local media on why Iran's position against the knighthood was more moderate when compared to other Muslim nations especially that of nearby Pakistan (see below). Hosseini noted that not only had he immediately condemned the knighthood as Islamophobia, but in a seeming reversal of his nation's previous stand said "The stance of the Islamic Republic of Iran with regard to this issue has not changed from what was put forward by Imam Khomeini." In a similar statement Parliamentarian for Tehran, Mehdi Kuchakzadeh, said "Rushdie died the moment the late Imam (Ayatollah Khomeini) issued the fatwa."

Also on the 25th, Alaeddin Boroujerdi, the head of Majlis National Security and Foreign Policy Commission appeared with his Norwegian counterpart (Olaf Akselsson) to respond to Norway's request for a cancellation of the death fatwa. Boroujerdi stated that the "Late Imam Khomeini's decree on Salman Rushdie is eternal and irrevocable. Honoring religious sanctities is necessary and all societies must respect this. All countries have a red line in their policies. For instance, in spite of freedom of speech a university professor and a political figure loses his job because of denying the Holocaust in Europe, insulting Muhammad has caused the late Imam to issue the decree which is irreversible."

On 29 June 2007, Ayatollah Ahmad Jannati delivering Friday prayers over state run radio said he "hoped that the late Imam Khomeini's 1989 fatwa in sentencing the apostate writer to death will go in effect." He also spoke about the knighthood saying that "The result of such an act of Britain is its turning into [the] bete noire of the world nations. These measures are the reason the US and Britain have become the most hated states in the world's developed camp." He also called on the people of Iraq and Lebanon "to be vigilant against the arrogant powers' divisive plots."

=== Private bounty offered ===
The Organisation to Commemorate Martyrs of the Muslim World offered $150,000 to anyone killing Rushdie. Their secretary general, Forouz Rajaefar, declared that "The British and the supporters of the anti-Islam Salman Rushdie could rest assured that the writer's nightmare will not end until the moment of his death and we will bestow kisses on the hands of whomsoever is able to execute this apostate."

== Pakistani reaction ==
=== Early protests ===
After the news of the knighthood was released, "hundreds of people participated in protests in Islamabad and other cities" with some of the protesters calling on their government "to expel the British high commissioner".

=== Parliament's first resolution ===
On 18 June 2007, Pakistan's parliament passed a resolution condemning the knighthood and demanding the British revoke it. The resolution was passed unanimously.

==== Ijaz-ul-Haq's comments ====
After the resolution was passed Pakistan's Religious Affairs Minister Muhammad Ijaz-ul-Haq, made an address to the parliament which was carried by local television stations. Haq said that "insults to Islam were at the root of terrorism", and that "if someone committed a suicide bombing to protect the honour of the Prophet Mohammad, his act was justified." He called on all Muslim governments to break ties with Britain and warned that "This is an occasion for the [world's] 1.5 billion Muslims to look at the seriousness of this decision. If Muslims do not unite, the situation will get worse and Salman Rushdie may get a seat in the British parliament." When asked about his comments about suicide bombing later Haq stated that he "did not mean such attacks would be justified but was merely saying militants could use the knighthood as a justification." Former prime minister Benazir Bhutto condemned the minister's comments, seeing them as a call to assassinate Rushdie, she said "The minister... son of a previous military dictator (Mohammad Zia-ul-Haq) who had patronised [Islamic] extremist groups, had done a great disservice both to the image of Islam and the standing of Pakistan by calling for the murder of foreign citizens." The speaker of Pakistan's National Assembly expunged Haq's speech from the official record, citing the national interest. Abdul Rashid Ghazi, who ran the hardline Red Mosque in Islamabad, responded to Haq's initial comments saying "Salman Rushdie deserves to be killed and anyone who has the power must kill him."

After Pakistan's legislature passed its resolution against the honour, the road outside the parliament building was soon blocked by 300 burqa wearing female Islamists waving flags and placards against the knighthood.

=== UK diplomat summoned ===
On 19 June 2007 the British High Commissioner, Robert Brinkley, was called in by the Pakistani Foreign Ministry and told that "Salman Rushdie has been a controversial figure who is known less for his literary contribution and more for his offensive and insulting writing which deeply hurts the sentiments of Muslims all over the world. Conferment of a knighthood on Salman Rushdie shows an utter lack of sensitivity on the part of the British government." They also told him that Rushdie's knighthood is a breach of United Nations Security Council Resolution 1624, which calls on all member states to "enhance dialogue and broaden understanding...[to prevent] the indiscriminate targeting of religions and cultures". Responding to the summons Ambassador Brinkley said "that the honour was not meant to offend Muslims". He also voiced Britain's "deep concern" at the comments by Pakistan's Religious Affairs Minister Muhammad Ijaz-ul-Haq about suicide bombers telling them that "nothing can justify suicide bomb attacks". Haq later announced that he hoped to go to Britain soon to help "clear misunderstandings". Haq then announced he will be travelling to London with a delegation to discuss ways of engaging Muslim clerics. The British Foreign Office declared that there was no official visit with Haq scheduled but "It's not a matter for us if he is making a private visit."

Later Pakistani Foreign Office spokeswoman Tasneem Aslam announced that her government formally asked the Organization of the Islamic Conference (a permanent delegation at the United Nations) to take a clear stance on Rushdie's knighthood. She said "We have formally approached the OIC to take a position on it," but she also noted that as there was no procedure to move the world body itself, her nation had no plans to approach the UN.

=== Pakistani leaders speak ===
On 21 June 2007, Afzal Sahi, the speaker of the Punjab provincial assembly reflecting on the knighthood said "blasphemers should be killed, I will murder a blasphemer if he comes across me.", and Chaudhry Shujaat Hussain, president of Pakistan's ruling party, accused UK Prime Minister Tony Blair of being "personally and mentally against Islam". Arbab Ghulam Rahim, the chief minister of Sindh province, said his outrage at the knighthood was causing him to return medals won by his grandfather and other relatives when the country was under UK colonial rule back to the British High Commission. Speaking during a trip to Washington D.C. Pakistan's foreign minister, Khurshid Kasuri, said that "Britain could not have been surprised by the outrage."

=== Private bounty placed on Rushdie's head ===
Also on the 21st, the General Secretary of the Islamabad Traders Association, Ajmal Baloch announced during a protest against the knighthood that "We will give 10 million rupees (USD 165,000) to anyone who beheads Rushdie." He also called on all Islamic countries to boycott British products.

=== 22 June protests ===
On 22 June 2007, thousands of Pakistanis took part in protests led by the radical MMA Parliamentary alliance at the conclusion of prayer services. Friday protesters in Islamabad numbered around 300, they chanted "Death to blasphemer Rushdie! Death to Britain!" and "Our struggle will continue until Salman Rushdie is killed!" The crowd was addressed by parliamentary opposition leader (and noted supporter of the Taliban) cleric Fazalur Rehman who told them that "Britain must withdraw the knighthood and hand Rushdie to Pakistan to be punished under Islamic laws." Muttahida Majlis-e-Ammal Fazal ur Rehman a member of the parliamentary religious alliance told the demonstrators that "'Britain has opened a new front against Muslims by awarding a criminal like Rushdie."

In Karachi, over a thousand demonstrators chanted in support of Ejaz-ul-Haq's initial comments that they held to be an endorsement of Rushdie's assassination by suicide bombing. In the city of Multan, the British flag, and effigies of Rushdie and Queen Elizabeth II have been set aflame during protests in the country throughout the week of the news of the announcement with protesters chanting "Kill him! Kill him!" There were also mass protests in Lahore, Rawalpindi, Quetta, and Peshawar.

=== Parliament's second resolution ===
On 22 June 2007 Pakistan's government renewed its call for the UK to withdraw the honour. Parliamentary Affairs Minister Sher Afghan Niazi told the parliament "The British government has not withdrawn the title which has not only disappointed the entire Pakistani nation but has also hurt it. This august house again calls on the British government and its Prime Minister Tony Blair to immediately withdraw the title... and tender an apology to the Muslim world." Niazi's resolution passed unanimously. Khwaja Saad Rafiq a legislator from the party of exiled former premier Nawaz Sharif called for Rushdie's execution saying "Whosoever kills him will be the hero of Muslims."

Canadian author and Muslim Irshad Manji pointed out that Pakistan's Parliament has been silent on Islamist "assaults on fellow believers" in Iraq and Afghanistan, writing "I am offended that amid the internecine carnage, a professed atheist named Salman Rushdie tops the to-do list."

=== Clerics honour Bin Laden in response ===
In reaction to the announcement of the knighthood, the Pakistan Ulema Council bestowed Osama bin Laden with the title "Saifullah", or sword of Allah. Their chairman, Tahir Ashrafi, said "We have awarded this title in reply to Britain's decision to knight blasphemer Rushdie. If a blasphemer can be given the title 'Sir' by the West despite the fact he's hurt the feelings of Muslims, then a mujahid who has been fighting for Islam against the Russians, Americans and British must be given the lofty title of Islam, Saifullah."

== Malaysian PAS Party reaction ==
On Thursday, 21 June 2007, thirty members of the hard-line Islamic PAS opposition party led a protest to the British High Commission calling for the honour to be revoked. The protesters chanted "Destroy Salman Rushdie, Destroy Britain!" and "Go to hell, Britain!; Go to hell, Rushdie!" The PAS' treasurer, Hatta Ramli, said making Rushdie a knight "has tainted the whole knighthood, the whole hall of fame of the British system. The British government must be responsible because it has created a sudden feeling of anger not just on Salman Rushdie but on the British government. They have to bear the consequences." After the "rare half-hour demonstration" the PAS members delivered a one-page memorandum to the British envoy written by PAS president Abdul Hadi Awang. It read, "In the name of peace and mutual respect, we demand the award be withdrawn, and the British government distance itself from a provocateur like Salman Rushdie."

On 29 June 2007, following Friday prayers, the Muslim fundamentalist PAS Party again led a march of around 300 activists outside the British High Commission and the United States embassy in Kuala Lumpur. They denounced both the knighthood and US policy in the Middle East. They were monitored by riot police equipped with trucks carrying water cannons but the event did not descend into violence. The "Protesters spent 15 minutes outside the building, chanting slogans and waving posters that read 'Unite for Islam', 'Death penalty for Salman' and 'Salman Rushdie Get Lost From This World.'" One placard had a caricature of Rushdie with horns growing out of his head. At the 20 minute rally outside the US embassy, they shouted "Down with Bush!" and "Crush America!" The PAS spokesman at the demonstration said America was "trying to dominate Muslim countries" and was interfering "all over the world."

== Afghan reaction ==
Afghanistan's Taliban released a statement on the Internet in response to the knighthood, saying "We hope that Muslims and Islamic societies show a strong and serious response ... and to force the British government to apologise to Muslims and retract this title." Reading a statement by the group's leadership over the phone to reporters a Taliban spokesman called Rushdie an "apostate" and said "We consider this another major affront to Islam by the infidels."

The US-installed Afghan government made no comment on the award.

== Kuwaiti reaction ==
On 27 June 2007, the National Assembly of Kuwait stated its "disappointment and discontent" on the knighthood describing the step as "hurting Muslim feelings." The Assembly's statement said that "such measures as knighting those who combat the Islamic faith and challenge its principles do not create a positive climate or contribute to the success of any dialogue between civilizations, or help to create a common ground of understanding between the West and the Islamic world. ...[Bestowing the honour was] provocative and unbecoming conduct that is likely to worsen the fundamentalist behaviour that marks several cultures." They stated that "mutual respect among religious faiths and sects" was the best way "to ensure a peaceful and safe international social climate, which is free of discrimination, tension and worries." The Kuwaiti government also summoned their British ambassador to formally protest against the award.

== Egyptian reaction ==
On 20 June 2007, the Egyptian Parliament criticised the knighthood. Parliamentary speaker Fathi Sorur invoked the Jyllands-Posten Muhammad cartoons controversy declaring that "To honour someone who has offended the Muslim religion is a bigger error still than the publication of caricatures attacking the Prophet Mohammed."

== Azerbaijani reaction ==
Ilqar Ibrahimoglu, the coordinator of the Centre for the Protection of Freedom of Conscience and Religion in Azerbaijan, stated that "such measures can be the cause of the strengthening aggression of the West against Islam. They provoke Muslims. Muslims should be very careful, watchful and cold-blooded." The Azerbaijani government has not issued any statements on the matter and there have been no organised protests.

== Iraqi reaction ==
Iraq's Foreign Minister Hoshyar Zebari was in London meeting with Foreign Secretary Margaret Beckett when the news of Rushdie's knighthood broke. Zebari said that while he "respected the right of Britain to decide who received the honour...the decision could be used to cause trouble. For my government, we share the views of many Muslims. Iraq is a Muslim country. We believe that, with all due respect to the knighthood, I think it was untimely. This is my view. I don't have any official position from my government on this issue, but I think it would be used by many quarters to exploit this issue outside this country." The Iraqi government has taken no official position on the matter and there have been no protests about it there. Speaking with Zebari, Beckett said "Obviously we are sorry if there are people who have taken very much to heart this honour, which is after all for a lifelong body of literary work." She also pointed out that Rushdie was among many Muslims who had been awarded by the British honours system – a fact that "may not be realized by many of those who have been vocal in their opposition."

== Indonesian reaction ==
In Indonesia, Yenny Zannuba Wahid, head of the Wahid Institute and the daughter of former president Abdurrahman Wahid, condemned both the knighthood and calls for retaliation. She felt the honour was undeserved "We deeply regret and strongly criticize it because the book is not at all praiseworthy." She said that though she "regretted Rushdie's action of selling his religion to get popularity, nobody had the right to revoke his right to exercise freedom of speech. We cannot revoke his right to express his views. Even those who do not believe in God have rights. They cannot be punished or killed or subjected to arbitrary acts. Islam does not teach violence." Moeslim Abdurrahman an Islamic scholar from the Muhammadiyah organisation, called on his nation to mediate between the UK and the Muslim world, adding "Indonesia needs to reduce (tension) and not to complicate the matter. If Indonesia also gets angry it will contribute nothing."

== Indian reaction ==
There were protests in different parts of India over the knighthood, including one in Kanpur led by the AJ Fareedi Association denouncing Britain and chanting slogans against Rushdie. The Islamic Centre of India began a petition campaign with the result to be handing over a banner to the British High Commissioner in New Delhi covered with thousands of signatures. The centre's general secretary, Maulana Khalid Rasheed Farangimahli, announced in his Friday sermon that by honouring Rushdie the UK "has acted against the whole Muslim community around the world." He demanded the Indian government alert Britain of their outrage. The leaders of the Sunni Board of India also condemned the move in a Friday meeting, likewise they demanded the Indian government express their anger to the British.

The Ulema Council of India said "the decision to honor Indian-born Rushdie reflects the anti-Islamic attitude of the British government." Its spokesmen, Maulana Abul Hasan, stated "Salman Rushdie is a detested figure among Muslims. The British government has hurt Muslim feelings by honoring a person who is facing a fatwa for blasphemous writings." On Sunday 24 June 2007 the Ulema Council joined with the Islamic Center of India, and the All India Sunni Board in sending a joint statement to the British High Commission in New Delhi condemning the knighthood.

== Reactions in Britain ==
=== Politicians ===
Besides the reactions of Home Secretary John Reid and Foreign Secretary Margaret Beckett (see above), other UK politicians have expressed their view on the honour.

Lord Ahmed of Rotherham, a senior Labour Muslim peer, appealed to ministers to put the award on hold and told them that British Muslim business owners were attempting to organise a nationwide strike over the matter. Ahmed said "I would urge and plead with all Muslims around the world to remain calm." He also stated his belief that Rushdie's The Satanic Verses was also an insult to Christianity and had put "Her Majesty the Queen in a very difficult position". He also commented, "Actually, I was appalled to hear that Salman Rushdie had been given a knighthood, particularly when this man has been very divisive. This man – as you can see – not only provoked violence around the world because of his writings, but there were many people that were killed around the world and honouring the man who has blood on his hands, sort of because of what he did, honouring him I think is going a bit too far."

Conservative MP Stewart Jackson (the chairman of the all-party group on Pakistan) spoke against the honour, saying "We do not need a situation where we are gratuitously offending our allies in the fight against terror. I think the prime minister's office should think very carefully about that decision."

The Leader of the House of Commons, Jack Straw, said he sympathised with "the concerns and sensitivity in the [Muslim] community... [but there could be] no justification whatever for suggestions that as a result of this a further fatwa should be placed on the life of Mr Rushdie". Officials at the Cabinet Office denied charges that the honours vetting committees had failed to consider the wider implications knighting Rushdie. One Labour MP speaking to reporters off the record noted that a week before Gordon Brown becomes Prime Minister the award "reinforces the impression that nobody's in control. Anybody with any common sense would have blocked this."

Conservative home affairs spokesman David Davis stated "Whatever you think of the work of Salman Rushdie, freedom of speech is a fundamental freedom in this country. What is more, the sovereign's choice of who she wishes to honour will never be the subject of intimidation."

=== Protests ===
On 22 June 2007, dozens of British Muslims (some with scarves masking their faces) gathered outside Regent's Park mosque denouncing Rushdie's knighthood, "noisily renewing calls for his death", and burning a poster of the British flag. They addressed worshippers leaving Friday services and soon had attracted a crowd of over 100 people. The demonstrators chanted "Death to Rushdie! Death to the queen!" and had signs with slogans such as "Salman Rushdie should be punished, not praised." Protest organiser Anjem Choudray (an ex-head of the British wing of the banned radical group al-Muhajiroun who helped co-ordinate the protests over the Jyllands-Posten cartoons) said "This knighthood is just another example of Tony Blair and his government's attempts to secularize Muslims and reward apostates. Rushdie is a hate figure across the Muslim world. This honour will have ramifications here and across the world. The awards pass across his (Blair's) desk and he could easily have blocked it, knowing it would offend Muslims everywhere." He pointed to the protests in Iran, Pakistan, and Malaysia as proof that the outcry was growing. Another protester told reporters "We've come to demonstrate against the apostate Salman Rushdie. He has insulted Islam and the Prophet Muhammad. Salman Rushdie is the devil. We have a responsibility – he should be punished, he should be attacked. We should not be afraid of the kuffar. They say Tony Blair is going to be sent to the Middle East as a peace envoy. We hope he comes back in a box."

The director general's staff at the mosque distanced themselves from the protesters, saying "We do not sanction this protest or the views they are expressing."

Ghayasuddin Siddiqui, leader of the Muslim Parliament, condemned the protest, saying "This is unacceptable behaviour which the majority of Muslims in this country would not support. There's no denying a large section of the Muslim community feel very hurt about this issue. But having expressed your anger and frustration you've got to move forward. Unfortunately there will always be some strange lunatics, like in any community, who give others a bad name."

Fiona Mactaggart, the MP for Slough, upset some British Muslims by declaring the protest over the knighthood a "press stunt". Members of Slough's Muslim community claim she ignored them when they tried to present a petition to her at the surgery she held for constituents. She claims in turn that they neither contacted her nor tried to approach her at the surgery.

The Muslim Council of Europe called for a mass demonstration outside Blackburn Town Hall on 21 July 2007.

=== Muslim Council ===
The Muslim Council of Britain released a statement saying they were "disturbed at the deliberate political decision to confer a knighthood to Salman Rushdie...[who] caused deep hurt to Muslims everywhere." They characterised the honour as a "deliberate provocation". They offered suggestions to mosques and Islamic groups in the UK urging their fellow Muslims to "face provocation with dignity and wisdom" when protesting the knighthood and "resist efforts by fringe elements in the community to exploit disappointment felt at the award." They wrote "We should not allow the situation to be inflamed in any way or be exploited by other unsavory groups so as to bring our community and our noble faith into disrepute." They called for Muslims to "convey their feelings on the matter through letters to their parliamentary representatives and through local and national media...[and to take the] opportunity to correct the maligning of the character of the prophet in the book which earned its author his notoriety."

Muhammad Abdul Bari, the Muslim Council's secretary-general, said "Salman Rushdie earned notoriety amongst Muslims for the highly insulting and blasphemous manner in which he portrayed early Islamic figures. The granting of a knighthood to him can only do harm to the image of our country in the eyes of hundreds of millions of Muslims across the world. Many will interpret the knighthood as a final contemptuous parting gift from Tony Blair to the Muslim world."

=== Scotland Yard ===
Scotland Yard officials said the "angry reaction to Rushdie's knighthood meant that a new threat assessment would have to be drawn up for him." He was also likely to "be given fresh advice on the precautions he takes abroad, and the unit around him in Britain is likely to be upgraded."

== Mention by Al-Hesbah during attempted car bombings ==
When the events around the 2007 London car bombs occurred CBS News on 29 June 2007 reported that a message appeared on the widely used militant Internet forum Al-Hesbah at 08:09, 28 June 17 hours before the first car bomb was discovered. It read

"In the name of God, the most compassionate, the most merciful. Is Britain Longing for al Qaeda's bombings? We, and the whole world has seen what Britain has done ... their intention to honour Salman Rushdie who insulted and slandered Islam. This 'honoring' came at a crucial time, a time when the whole nation is reeling from the crusaders attacks on all Muslim lands. The British capital has witnessed blessed operations that shook it to its foundations. This was because the British had attacked the lands of Muslims and Al Qaeda is still threatening to strike against Britain to throw it out of the lands of Islam. But now, there's yet another reason for Al Qaeda to carry out such threats; the honouring of the apostate Salman Rushdie by the Crusaders ... Rushdie who insulted Islam ... and this reason has led Muslims to become even more sympathetic with the Mujahideen. The question now is: Has London longed for the bombings of Al Qaeda? We say to Britain: The Emir of al Qaeda, Sheikh Osama, has once threatened you, and he carried out his threats. Today I say: Rejoice, by Allah, London shall be bombed."

While some speculated that the bombing attempts "may have been revenge for the knighthood bestowed on author Salman Rushdie...there was no hard evidence of any motive."

On 12 July 2007, The Times of India claimed "It was knighthood to writer Salman Rushdie, which has angered many radical Islamic groups, that forced alleged bomber Kafeel Ahmed to execute the Glasgow airport attack. Investigators have stumbled upon this while gathering details about his transformation from a devout student to a radical." The report did not provide any further details or name the investigators.

== Mention by Al-Qaeda ==
On 10 July 2007, BBC news reported that Al-Qaeda have also condemned the Rushdie honour. In a 20-minute audio recording entitled "Malicious Britain and its Indian Slaves" which was released onto a militant Islamic website, Al-Qaeda deputy Ayman al-Zawahiri condemned British involvement in Afghanistan, and Iraq and called Rushdie's knighthood "an insult to Islam". He went on to remark, "I say to (Queen) Elizabeth and (former prime minister Tony) Blair that your message has reached us and we are in the process of preparing for you a precise response". Concerning the recording, the British Foreign Office stated "The Government has already made clear that Rushdie's honour was not intended as an insult to Islam or the Prophet Muhammad."
