= Mohammed Asha =

British neurosurgeon

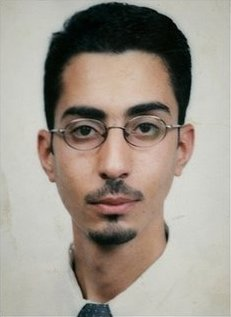
Mohammed Asha

Mohammed Jamil Abdelqader Ashar (Arabic: محمد جميل عبد القادر عشا) is a Saudi-born Jordanian doctor resident in the United Kingdom, who was a suspect arrested after the 2007 Glasgow Airport attack. He was falsely charged with conspiracy to murder and conspiracy to cause explosions, but on 16 December 2008 was found not guilty and acquitted on all charges.

== Early life and medical career ==
A Jordanian who was born in Saudi Arabia to a family originating from Palestine, Asha moved to Jordan with his family in 1991. He attended Jubilee School in Amman, a school for gifted children, where he is remembered as a dedicated student who was bookish and introverted. He won prizes for his Arabic poetry and met Queen Noor, King Hussein of Jordan's 4th wife, when she visited his school. In 1998, Asha received a 98.3% overall mark in his school's leaving exams and he later gained the 3rd highest mark Jordan's national medical entrance exam.

Asha entered the University of Jordan's medical school and graduated with a medical degree in 2004. During his medical studies he used his talent for poetry to woo his future wife, Marwah Dana, a laboratory researcher. He married Marwah in 2004. In the same year, Asha competed against 500 medical students and won a place at University of Birmingham, studying neurology.

Asha moved to the UK in 2005 with his wife, and undertook post-graduate training at the Prince Philip Hospital in Llanelli, Wales and the Royal Shrewsbury Hospital, Shropshire. Asha then moved to Addenbrooke's Hospital in Cambridge, where he met Bilal Abdulla and Kafeel Ahmed. In 2007, Asha lived in the village of Chesterton with his wife and young son Anas, and worked as a junior neurosurgeon at the University Hospital of North Staffordshire in Stoke-on-Trent. Consultant neurosurgeon Rupert Price said he gave Asha the best reference he ever wrote and he believed that Asha was on-track to become one of Britain's top neurosurgeons.

== Glasgow Airport attack ==
=== Arrest ===
On 1 July 2007, the day after the attack on Glasgow Airport, Asha and his wife were arrested in a rolling roadblock on the M6 motorway in Cheshire. Asha explained to police that they were travelling to a jewellers, as he wished to buy an anniversary wedding ring for his wife. His wife was later released without charge and she returned to her family in Jordan. Following his arrest, he was suspended from his medical duties. On 20 July 2007, Asha became the fourth suspect to be charged, with conspiracy to murder and conspiracy to cause explosions, in relation to the attack. A month earlier, it is believed that he had been offered the only ST1 training post in neurosurgery available in the West Midlands, one of a handful available throughout the country in the British government's MTAS system for junior doctor selection.

=== Trial and acquittal ===
At his trial, the jury was told that Asha lent his friend, Bilal Abdullah, £1,500. However, Asha insisted that he felt disturbed at Abdulla's growing fascination with Islamist terrorism, and that he disliked Kafeel Ahmed, the deceased conspirator. In a police interview, Asha described how he attempted to encourage Abdulla to 'settle down, concentrate on his career and abandon such silly thoughts'.

On 16 December 2008 Asha was found not guilty of conspiracy to murder and conspiracy to cause explosions, the jury accepted that he was clearly innocent and knew nothing of the plot that his colleagues, Bilal Abdulla and Kafeel Ahmed, had planned. The judge at his trial criticised the counter-terrorism police for twice interviewing Asha without a solicitor and in his summing up he told the jury, "What this trial may have revealed to you, on this occasion, [is that] Mohammed Asha's rights were not fully respected." Footage played to the jury showed police officers swearing at and ridiculing Asha, and the prosecution also admitted that interviewing officers told Asha that they found new evidence regarding him which they knew to be untrue.

Following his acquittal, Asha was transferred from Belmarsh category A high security prison into the custody of the UK Immigration Service, where he awaited deportation to his home of country of Jordan on the grounds that his presence in the UK was "not conducive to the national good". Asha contested deportation and in January 2009 he was released on bail after the Special Immigration Appeals Commission (SIAC) concluded it was not in the public interest to prevent him from returning to work. On 7 August 2009 the UK Immigration Service dropped its attempt to have Asha deported and he applied for leave to remain.

=== Aftermath ===
Asha returned to the NHS, which was covered by The Sun, leading to a libel case, resulting in an apology by the newspaper.

== See also ==
- 2007 UK terrorist incidents
- Lotfi Raissi
