= Sabeel Ahmed =

Indian doctor convicted in connection with a terrorism investigation

Sabeel Ahmed is an Indian doctor who was arrested after the 2007 Glasgow Airport attack and later convicted in the United Kingdom of possessing information that could have prevented an act of terrorism.. He studied at the Dr B R Ambedkar Medical College, an affiliated college of the Rajiv Gandhi University of Health Sciences between 1998 and 2003 and completed his internship in 2003–2004, moving to the UK in November 2004 to pursue higher studies.

Ahmed is the brother of Kafeel Ahmed, who was also arrested after the attack. The Ahmed brothers were second cousins of Muhamed Haneef, an Indian doctor who was arrested at Brisbane Airport on 2 July 2007 during the wider investigation. Haneef's barrister also described the prosecution case as relying on the claim that Haneef was "their second cousin" and had given his mobile phone and SIM card to Sabeel Ahmed.

Australian authorities alleged that Haneef had left his British mobile phone SIM card with Ahmed before moving from the United Kingdom to Australia for a job at Gold Coast Hospital in Queensland. The allegation became central to the Australian case against Haneef, but was later questioned after reports said the SIM card had not been found in the vehicle used in the Glasgow attack, as initially claimed, but in Liverpool near where Ahmed was arrested.

Ahmed was reported to have applied for medical positions in Western Australia in 2005, but the applications were rejected because of concerns about qualifications and references.

On 14 July 2007, British police charged Ahmed with failing to disclose information that could have prevented an act of terrorism. In April 2008, he was sentenced to 18 months in prison after pleading guilty to possessing information that could have prevented an act of terrorism.

Ahmed was deported back to India on 8 May 2008 after being released because of time already served. He later moved to Saudi Arabia in 2010 to work at a hospital. According to The Indian Express, the National Investigation Agency arrested him in 2020 after his deportation from Saudi Arabia in connection with an alleged Lashkar-e-Taiba recruitment case registered in Bengaluru in 2012. The report also stated that Delhi Police had accused him in 2017 of trying to recruit Indians for Al Qaeda in the Indian Subcontinent.

== See also ==
- 2007 UK terrorist incidents
