= Muhamed Haneef =

Indian born doctor (born 1979)

Dr Muhamed Haneef
- Born: 29 September 1979 (age 47); India
- Citizenship: India, UAE
- Occupation: Doctor of Medicine
- Known for: Accused of terrorism, and subsequent detention
- Criminal charges: Terrorism, later acquitted.
- Spouse: Firdous Arshiya
- Parent: Shami Khaleel (father)

Muhamed Haneef (born 29 September 1979) is an Indian-born doctor who was falsely accused of aiding terrorists, and left Australia upon cancellation of his visa amid great political controversy. His visa was later reinstated and he was given some compensation.

Haneef was arrested on 2 July 2007 at Brisbane Airport, Brisbane, Australia on suspicion of terror-related activities. He is the second cousin once removed of Kafeel Ahmed and Sabeel Ahmed, the operatives in the 2007 Glasgow Airport attack. Haneef's ensuing detention became the longest without charge in recent Australian history, which caused great controversy in Australia and India.

Haneef was released when the Director of Public Prosecutions withdrew its charge on 27 July 2007, whereby his passport was returned and he departed Australia voluntarily on 29 July 2007. Haneef's visa cancellation was overturned by the Federal Court on 21 August 2007, with the decision being reiterated by the full bench of the court on 21 December 2007, resulting in Haneef having his Australian visa returned.

In December 2010, Haneef returned to Australia to seek damages for loss of income, interruption of his professional work, and emotional distress. He was awarded compensation from the Australian government. The amount of compensation awarded was not disclosed, but was described by sources as "substantial".

== Life in India ==
Raised a Muslim, Haneef is from Mudigere, in the coffee-rich Chikkamagaluru district of the state of Karnataka in India, where his late father, Shami Khaleel, was a teacher. Haneef's father died in a road accident when he was 18. Shortly after this Haneef moved with his family to Bangalore, and completed his pre-university certification course at SDM College in Ujire in the neighbouring district of Dakshina Kannada. He subsequently studied medicine at the Tripura Medical College & Dr. B.R. Ambedkar Memorial Teaching Hospital from 1997 to 2002, achieving a first-class degree.

== Life in Australia ==
Haneef worked at Halton Hospital in Runcorn Cheshire, before applying for a job in Australia under that country's temporary skilled worker scheme, after reading an advertisement in the March 2006 issue of the British Medical Journal. In Australia, he worked as a registrar at the Gold Coast Hospital from September 2006, and lived in an apartment several blocks from the hospital.

=== Arrest ===
Haneef was arrested on 2 July 2007 at Brisbane Airport, Brisbane, Australia for suspected terror-related activities, specifically in connection to the attack at Glasgow Airport in the UK, a few days earlier. He was about to board an international flight. He was the first person arrested and detained under the 2005 Australian Anti-Terrorism Act and the first to have his detention extended under the Act, being detained for twelve days without being charged with a crime.

Mick Keelty, the Australian Federal Police Commissioner, acknowledged that Haneef "may have done nothing wrong and may at the end of the day be free to go."

=== Investigation, allegations, and responses ===
==== The one-way ticket ====
At the time of his arrest, Haneef was attempting to make a one-way trip to India. This led authorities to believe Haneef's attempted exit from Australia on 2 July was directly linked to the arrest of his cousin Kafeel Ahmed, who suffered 90% burns after the Glasgow Airport attack on 30 June. They discounted the possibility that Haneef was returning to see his six-day-old daughter, who had neonatal jaundice, and wife who had given birth to her first child by emergency caesarean section.

Following his arrest, Haneef's family claimed that any link between him and the terrorists is only tenuous, and a case of guilt by association, that he was not involved in the plot, and that he was returning to India to see his wife and daughter. Haneef's father-in-law said the doctor wanted to take his wife and daughter back to Australia after getting the infant a passport, and so travelled without a return ticket.

The AFP claimed in a court affidavit that Haneef, "had no explanation as to why he did not have a return ticket" from India to Australia. While the police affidavit stated Haneef "had no explanation" about his one-way ticket, the record of interview shows that he gave a detailed explanation to police while answering questions. Haneef told police that, as he did not have funds in his Australian bank account, his father-in-law had booked and paid for the one-way ticket with an understanding that "when I go there we can arrange for the coming back ticket. Because I just got 7 days' leave approved".

==== The SIM card ====
Australian authorities alleged that as Haneef left Britain he recklessly provided assistance to a terrorist organisation by leaving his relative, Sabeel Ahmed, a SIM card and the balance of a two-year mobile phone contract to use and pay off when he left Britain in July 2006. Relatives said that he left the SIM card behind to save money by not surrendering the remaining value of the contract to the telephone company. The prosecutor claimed the SIM card was found inside the vehicle used in the Glasgow attack. This allegation, central to the case, proved to be false and investigating British police officers concluded that the case was driven by politics rather than policing. Mick Keelty revealed that Scotland Yard had initially told Australian Federal Police investigators that the SIM card was found in the jeep confirming that the conduit for the SIM card error was the Australian Federal Police, contrary to Keelty's previous denials. A review by the Director of Public Prosecutions (DPP), Damian Bugg, revealed the allegations connected to the SIM card use were an "error of fact".

==== The shared flat ====
The AFP claimed in a court affidavit that Haneef told police in his first interview that he lived in Britain with the two terrorism suspects, his cousins: "On 2 July and 3 July 2007 Dr Haneef participated in a taped record of interview with the AFP and stated the following: Whilst in the UK he resided with suspects 1 and 2 (alleged suicide bomber Kafeel Ahmed and his brother Sabeel Ahmed), at 13 Bentley Road, Liverpool."

In subsequent Immigration Department documents used to advise Australian Immigration Minister Kevin Andrews, senior public servant Peter White asserted: "Dr Haneef advised the AFP that he resided with Dr Sabeel Ahmed at a boarding house located at 13 Bentley Road, Liverpool, UK." This error was not corrected by the AFP, and revealed by Hedley Thomas on 20 July in The Australian.

==== The diary ====
There was confusion with the handling of evidence, with Australian police presenting their own notes to Haneef under the impression that they were diary entries written by Haneef. This led to inaccurate claims that the police had written in the diary itself but it was confirmed that the police notes were not written in Haneef's diary.

==== Other allegations ====
Unsubstantiated media reports claim that Muhamed Haneef was in frequent and extensive contact with two men at the centre of Britain's car-bomb plot on the eve of their failed terror attacks. The online communication between Haneef and the bomb plotters was (supposedly) prolific and that authorities had (supposedly) gathered significantly more evidence against him than that has been disclosed publicly.

There are claims that computer records obtained by authorities reveal that Haneef remained in close contact with both Kafeel and his brother Sabeel until the failed bombings on 29 June. Haneef's colleagues at Gold Coast Hospital said Haneef "had made no mention of his planned personal trip to India, and had commented often about how well it worked to have his family living in India while he was working in Queensland"

Australian police alleged a link between Haneef and Bilal Abdullah, the owner and occupant of the Jeep used in the attack, by claiming Haneef admitted knowing a person named "Bilal" but refused to provide further information on him. In fact Haneef had actually stated he knew a "Bilab" and freely gave information about this person.

Australian intelligence authorities were reportedly probing a report in the Indian newspaper The Asian Age that alleged Haneef supposedly belonged to the now banned Student Islamic Movement of India (SIMI) when he was at medical school. Haneef's lawyer Peter Russo said he asked his client about the claim: "His response to it was it's simply not true", Mr Russo told ABC Radio.

Australia reportedly sought details from India of personal information such as banking transactions related to Haneef. The request came after Indian authorities declined to comply with a request for "friendly sharing of information" made by a representative of the Australian Federal Police during a visit there in late September 2007.

On Sunday, 22 July, some News Limited papers reported unsubstantiated claims from unnamed law enforcement sources that the AFP was investigating Haneef's alleged involvement in a plot to blow up a Gold Coast skyscraper. The reports also alleged that Haneef may have been one of a number of people who had expressed interest in the operations of planes at premises in Queensland. The Australian Federal Police commissioner Mick Keelty was forced to take the extraordinary step of publicly denying any substance to these claims.

=== Detention conditions ===
On 22 July, the Queensland government revealed that Haneef would be treated "as a terrorist" while detained in jail and subject to special conditions, including solitary confinement for 23 hours a day.

Queensland Police and Corrective Services Minister Judy Spence said the conditions of his detention included no contact with other inmates, meaning Haneef would be alone in a cell for all but one hour a day, when he would be allowed to exercise.

"Anyone who is charged under terrorist legislation is obviously seen as a greater threat to the good order of our society than other types of prisoners," she said.

Haneef was believed to have been moved from the Brisbane watchhouse to a nearby remand centre on the morning of 18 July. Just after 9:30 a.m. an armoured police van left the Brisbane City Watchhouse with a prisoner inside. The man was hunched over, hiding his face between his knees.

Haneef's wife Firdous Arshiya spoke of her relief at finally being able to speak to him by phone eleven days after he was arrested. Australia also revoked the visa of Firdous Arshiya; they did not provide a reason for the cancellation.

=== Charge ===
Australian authorities charged Haneef under Section 102.7(2) of the Criminal Code Act 1995. An offence under this section of the Act carries a maximum penalty of 15 years in prison. The basis of the charge was the allegation that he had intentionally provided support to an organisation, deemed to be a terrorist organisation under the terms of the act, whilst being reckless as to whether it was a terrorist organisation. The allegation centered on the gift of his own SIM card to his cousin, Sabeel Ahmed.

Haneef's links with his cousins were cited by police as a key factor in their case, and a Commonwealth prosecutor told magistrate Jacqui Payne:

Dr Haneef lived with these people.
He may have worked with these people.
He associated with these people.
He is their second cousin.

=== Granting of bail ===
Haneef was ordered to be freed on a relatively modest, $10,000 surety on 16 July 2007, after the public prosecutor failed to convince the magistrate that the doctor should be remanded in custody. His barrister, Stephen Keim, SC, argued for the Indian national to be released on bail and said the case against Haneef was "extremely weak". The matter was due to be heard again on 31 August 2007. After the decision by Immigration Minister Kevin Andrews to cancel his work visa, Haneef chose not to post bail, opting instead to remain in police custody until his appeal against the visa cancellation decision could be heard.

=== Cancellation of visa by government ===
Immigration Minister Kevin Andrews announced that Haneef's visa had been cancelled immediately on "character grounds" and, if released on bail, he would be taken into immigration detention. Mr Andrews said that the Australian Federal Police would issue a "criminal justice certificate", the effect of would be that Haneef will remain in immigration detention while legal proceedings are afoot. Mr Andrews said he had revoked Haneef's 457 temporary skills visa on character grounds, because he "reasonably suspected" that Haneef had an association with people involved in terrorism. He further said "I'm satisfied the cancellation is in the national interest. I have a responsibility and a duty as minister under the Act to turn my mind to the question of whether Haneef passes the character test.", This decision was criticised by the head of the Australian Bar Association, Stephen Estcourt who said "He can't do that"

The decision to revoke Haneef's visa was given in principle support by the Shadow Minister of Immigration, Tony Burke

On 31 July, Mr Andrews claimed to have canceled Haneef's visa based in part on an online chat that Haneef had with his brother prior to attempting to leave Australia.

=== Appeal to Federal Court against visa cancellation ===
Haneef's legal team lodged an appeal against this decision with the Federal Court. In the preliminary hearing, Justice Spender described as "absolutely astounding" the government's argument that mere association with a suspected criminal means a non-citizen fails the character test for the purposes of his visa, stating that even he could not pass the character test as he had represented murderers in the past: "Unfortunately, I would fail the character test on your statement because I have been associated with persons suspected of criminal conduct," adding "Suppose he had a cup of coffee with them 12 months ago, is that all association means?" the counsel representing the government, agreed, that would be enough for Justice Spender to fail the test, if he were a foreign citizen working in Australia on a visa.

Justice Spender was also sceptical of the timing of the minister's decision, just hours after Magistrate Jacqui Payne granted Haneef bail. He said it was "curious" the minister had not decided to cancel the visa earlier, adding "There is room for the view that this was an act of circumventing the inconvenience of having him on bail".

=== Leakage of interview transcript ===
On 18 July 2007, Haneef's barrister Stephen Keim confirmed that he had leaked a transcript of Haneef's initial interview with the AFP to the media in order to counter what he described as a campaign of damaging leaks by law enforcement agencies. The transcript, now mirrored on the Internet, was published on the website of The Australian newspaper then removed. Australia's Attorney-General, Philip Ruddock, claimed that to ensure a fair trial Haneef might have been forced to spend more time in detention as a result of the leaked transcript, Haneef's lawyers subsequently released the transcript from his second interview to the media.

=== Reaction of Government of India ===
Meanwhile, in India, the Australian High Commissioner, John McCarthy was summoned to the Ministry of External Affairs, and told of India's concern over the way Haneef was being treated. This came after Haneef's wife complained to the Prime Minister of India. The Ministry of External Affairs spokesman Navtej Sarna said, "The ministry expressed its concern to the Australian government that Dr Mohammed Haneef should be treated fairly and justly under Australian law".

The Indian high commission in Canberra helped Haneef's family arrange legal assistance. India twice sought consular access to Dr Haneef.

A minister of the Indian Government, E. Ahamed, met Haneef's family in Bangalore. Haneef's wife told him "India should put more pressure on Australia"

The prime minister of India was quoted as saying that he could not sleep the whole night owing to Haneef's arrest.

=== Criticism of prosecution case and government actions ===
Commonwealth prosecutor Clive Porritt had claimed that the SIM card was lent by Haneef to Sabeel Ahmed and was then passed to Khalid Ahmed before it was found in the wreckage of the Jeep Cherokee used in the Glasgow attack. It was subsequently reported by The Australian newspaper and ABC's AM program that the veracity of these claims are questionable, and that the SIM card was found in Liverpool at Sabeel Ahmed's residence. The handling of the case by the Australian Federal Police (AFP) and the Department of Public Prosecutions (DPP) has been criticised by Victorian Supreme Court Judge (then criminal lawyer) Lex Lasry, and former chairman of the National Crime Commission, Peter Faris. These claims were disputed by Federal Police Commissioner, Mick Keelty.

The Federal Labor party resisted offering criticism of the Government's handling of the issue and on several occasions offered the Government in principle support for Kevin Andrews' decision to cancel Haneef's visa. This contrasted with statements issued by The Greens which were strongly critical of the Government's actions. Federal Labor's failure to criticise the Government was widely seen as an attempt by its leadership to avoid a political wedge issue in the lead up to the late-2007 federal election.

Queensland Premier Peter Beattie criticised the Federal government over the handling of the case and called for an explanation. He was reported in The Australian newspaper to have said:

"I'm deeply concerned about where we are," Mr Beattie said. "If they have stuffed this up, they should come clean. There are now too many questions and it's just looking sloppy."

Bill Hayden, former Governor-General, also criticised the government's handling of the case, which he described as "frightening and appalling", and especially the cancellation of Haneef's visa by immigration minister Kevin Andrews, which Hayden described as "arbitrary".

=== Freedom ===
==== Dropping of charge by Director of Public Prosecutions ====
On 27 July, all charges against Haneef were dropped before Magistrate Wendy Cull in the Brisbane Magistrates Court. Prosecutor A.J. McSporran said that there would be "no reasonable prospect of a conviction of Haneef being secured." He told the court that prosecutors had made two mistakes at a bail hearing on 14 July.

One was their claim that Haneef's SIM card had been found in a burning jeep at Glasgow Airport when, in fact, it had been found in the possession of the brother of a terrorism suspect in Liverpool. The second error was their accusation that Haneef had once lived with some of the UK bombing suspects, when in fact he had not. The Australian Labor Party called for an external review of the handling of the Haneef case by the Office of the Commonwealth Director of Public Prosecutions.

==== Commonwealth Solicitor General's review of visa cancellation ====
On 27 July 2007 following the abandonment of the case by the Director of Public Prosecutions, the Minister held a press conference to announce that he had requested that the Commonwealth Solicitor General provide him with advice about whether his decision to cancel Haneef's visa should be reviewed, given the collapse of the prosecution's case. Pending the receipt of that advice, Minister Kevin Andrews made a Residence Determination under s197AB of the Migration Act 1958 to allow Haneef to be detained in the community, although with some restrictions on his movements and a requirement to report to authorities daily.

On 28 July, the Minister announced that the Solicitor-General had completed his review of the Minister's decision and formed the conclusion that Haneef's appeal will fail. As a result, the Minister has declined to reverse his decision and reaffirmed the intention of the Commonwealth to resist the appeal in the Federal Court.

On 31 July 2007, Kevin Andrews released further details of the review by the solicitor general which, he claimed, affirmed the minister's decision to revoke Haneef's visa.

==== Partial response by Haneef to Minister's claims ====
Haneef was quoted, in a British media report, as stating that the remark "nothing has been found about you" was in relation to a BBC report about the Glasgow and London incidents.

==== Calls for a formal apology ====
The then Premier of Queensland, Peter Beattie, on 30 July, said that Haneef had been treated "appallingly". "Kevin Andrews should be the subject of an inquiry, and the handling of the whole issue should be subject to a total reassessment," Mr Beattie said.

Mr Beattie said if any inquiry went ahead and found there was nothing to hold against Haneef, he should be given a formal apology.

You do not put someone in detention for this period of time then not pursue the matter against him in the courts without some sort of ... acknowledgement that a mistake was made, That's the least that we could do.

==== Clearing of name ====
On 30 August 2008, The Sydney Morning Herald reported that the Australian Federal Police had finally confirmed they have cleared Haneef as a suspect in the Glasgow attack.

In a short statement released to the media yesterday afternoon, the AFP confirmed it had informed Haneef's solicitor, Rod Hodgson, the federal Attorney-General, Robert McClelland, and the Home Affairs Minister, Bob Debus, that Haneef was "no longer a person of interest".

Rod Hodgson from Maurice Blackburn Lawyers, Haneef's lawyer said that Haneef was "extremely happy" but made no indication if Haneef would return to Australia.

== Return to India ==
Haneef's passport was returned to him, but his work visa was not returned. Within hours Haneef boarded a flight home to India. Immigration authorities prevented him holding a press conference prior to his departure. The 60 Minutes program broadcast an interview with him conducted before he left the country, on 29 July.

Peter Russo explained Haneef's decision to return home immediately as being motivated by a desire to see his family, in particular, his sick mother.

On 28 July, the Immigration Minister stated:

After taking advice, including from the Australian Federal Police, I have indicated that the Commonwealth has no objection to Haneef leaving Australia. Indeed the effect of the visa cancellation is that he should remove himself, he should depart Australia in any event,

A day later, Minister Kevin Andrews used the fact that Haneef had acted in accordance with his own advice as evidence that "heightens, rather than lessens" his suspicions about the correctness of his own as yet unpublished assessment of Haneef's alleged bad character.

=== Job kept open ===
There were mounting calls in Australia for the doctor to be allowed back to work, and the Gold Coast Hospital where he was working has said Haneef's job is waiting for him if he regains the visa. Haneef has not returned to this job, choosing to pursue a career in Dubai.

=== Family reactions ===
Haneef's family celebrated his release. "We've always known that he was innocent and now everyone else knows it too," Haneef's sister, Sumayya said. "It's been a year since we've last seen him and this last month has been so traumatic for us. We're all waiting to finally meet him. My brother has suffered so much this past month."

== Court case and return of visa ==
While in India, Haneef applied to have his visa reinstated through judicial review. The matter was held before Justice Spender, who on 20 August 2007 quashed Andrews' decision to cancel the visa. Spender ruled that the term "association" should not include mere social, family or professional relationships.

The government unsuccessfully appealed against the decision. After the verdict Haneef's visa was returned to him and the Gold Coast Medical Association and the Queensland Premier announced he is eligible to re-register with the medical board to practise in Queensland.

== Evidence of John Howard's involvement ==
During the 2008 inquiry into the Haneef affair, documents revealed that former Prime Minister John Howard became involved in the case within 48 hours of Haneef's arrest. Lawyers in the case have suggested that the early involvement of the Prime Minister meant that John Howard colluded with Immigration Minister Kevin Andrews to politicise the issue. John Howard has maintained that he had no involvement with the handling of the Haneef case.

== The Clarke Inquiry and Report ==
On 13 March 2008, the Commonwealth Attorney-General Robert McClelland announced former New South Wales Supreme Court Justice, the Hon. John Clarke SC would chair an inquiry into the 'arrest, detention, charging, prosecution and release' of Dr Haneef (the Clarke Inquiry).

The attorney-general labelled the Clarke inquiry a "judicial inquiry" [see Press Release 13 March 2008]. Dr Haneef's Lawyer, Stephen Keim called it a "virtual inquiry". The president of the Australian Council for Civil Liberties, Terry O'Gorman, called it a "Mickey Mouse inquiry".

The report was presented to the government on 21 November 2008, and to the public about 23 December 2008. (The government said it had delayed the release due to concerns it could impact trials in the United Kingdom.) The government responded.

The report concludes:

- The evidence against Mohamed Haneef was "completely deficient".
- ASIO reported to the government two days after Haneef's arrest that there was no information that he was guilty of anything;
- Commander Ramzi Jabbour, manager, counter-terrorism (domestic), had lost objectivity and was "unable to see that the evidence he regarded as highly incriminating in fact amounted to very little"; and
- Police officers Neil Thompson and Adam Simms, who interrogated Haneef, refused to charge him, so Jabbour did so himself.
