= June 2007 UK terrorist incidents =

Related car bomb and ramming attacks

On 29–30 June 2007, two related terrorist incidents occurred in the United Kingdom. In the second incident, one of the two perpetrators was killed, while five civilians were injured, none of them seriously.

On 29 June, two car bombs were discovered in London and disabled before they could be detonated. The first device was left near a Haymarket nightclub, and the second was left in a nearby area. On the following day, 30 June, a terrorist ramming attack occurred at Glasgow Airport when a dark green Jeep Cherokee loaded with propane canisters was driven at the glass doors of the main terminal and set ablaze.

Following the airport attack, two suspects were taken into custody and identified as Bilal Abdullah and Kafeel Ahmed. Ahmed was treated for severe self-inflicted burns and died on 2 August, while Abdullah was convicted of conspiracy to commit murder and sentenced to life imprisonment. Others were arrested as suspected accomplices, but most were eventually acquitted and released.

== Incidents and alerts ==
=== London ===
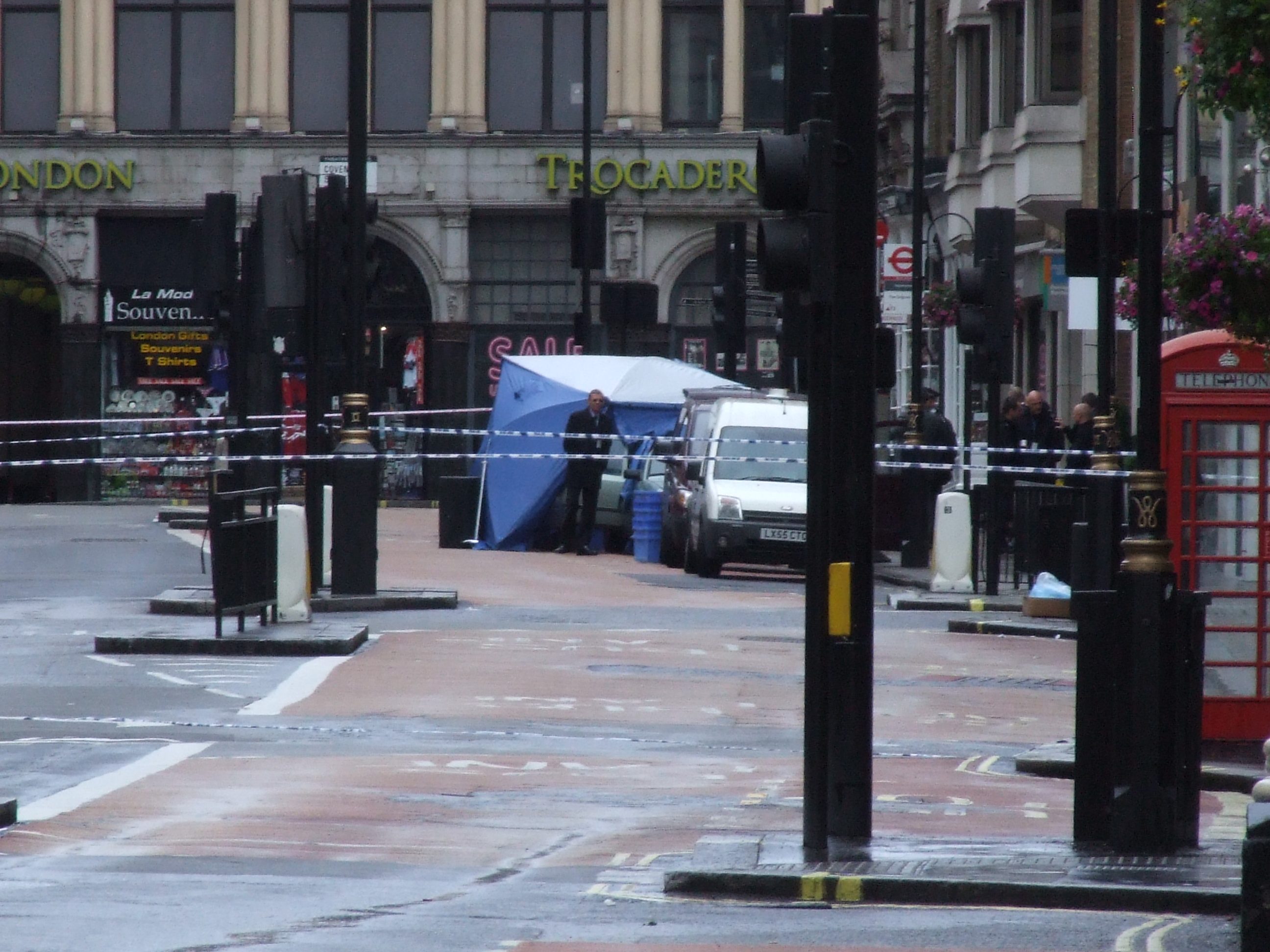
The Mercedes-Benz on Haymarket covered by a tent

On 29 June 2007, two unexploded car bombs were discovered in London. The first device was found in a car parked near the Tiger Tiger nightclub in Haymarket and two large gas canisters and a large number of nails were found in the car. The second device was left in a blue Mercedes-Benz saloon in nearby Cockspur Street, but it was not discovered until after the car had been towed away, as it was found to be illegally parked.

=== Glasgow Airport ===
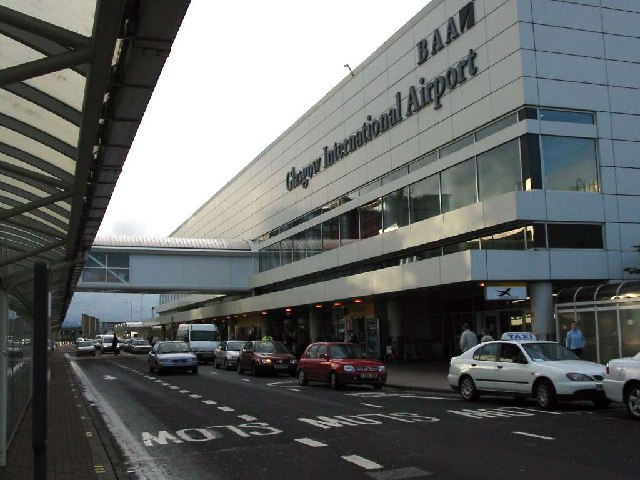
Front of the airport building where the attack took place

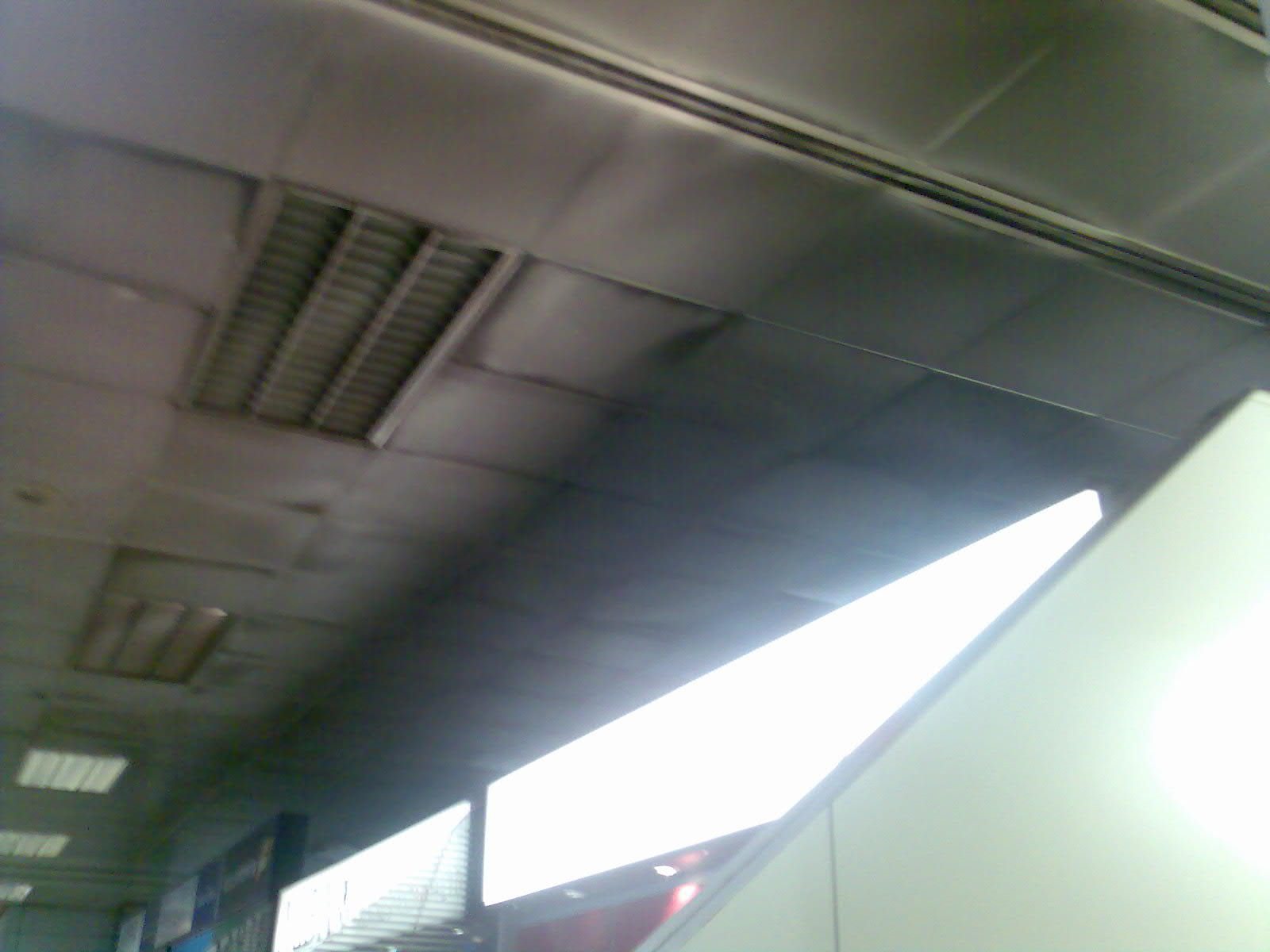
Internal damage caused to the terminal building.

On 30 June 2007, a dark green Jeep Cherokee was driven into the glass doors of the main terminal of Glasgow International Airport, and it burst into flames. A suspected car bomb inside failed to detonate, and the driver, Kafeel Ahmed, on fire after allegedly dousing himself in fuel, while the passenger, Bilal Abdullah, attacked the police. Fire extinguishers were used to put Ahmed out, and he was subsequently tackled by two police officers and bystanders. Abdullah was subsequently convicted of conspiracy to murder and sentenced to life imprisonment.

=== Subsequent alerts ===
During the evening of 30 June, Liverpool John Lennon Airport was closed for eight hours, whilst a vehicle was removed and taken away for forensic testing, reopening at about 04:40 on Sunday morning.

On 3 July, the discovery of a suspicious package led to the closure of Terminal 4 in Heathrow Airport from midday until the early evening.

== Intelligence and investigation ==
=== Warnings ===
On 30 June, ABC News reported that United States law enforcement officials were informed two weeks prior to the Glasgow incident of possible attacks on "airport infrastructure or aircraft" in Glasgow leading to the placement of Federal Air Marshals on flights into and out of Glasgow.

On 4 July, The Times reported that an al-Qaeda leader in Iraq boasted, to Canon Andrew White, before the failed bombing, that his group was planning to attack British targets and that "those who cure you will kill you". White passed this information onto the British government, but without the specific wording, in mid-April 2007.

=== Investigation ===
The UK Government blamed the events on al-Qaida and the two incidents were linked, by police, to the same two men.

By 3 July eight people, aged between 25 and 27, had been arrested. One of those arrests was made in Australia, the rest in the United Kingdom. All but Kafeel Ahmed, the Glasgow driver, have links with the National Health Service; six are believed to be doctors or medical students while the wife of one of those arrested formerly worked as a laboratory technician. Kafeel Ahmed applied, unsuccessfully, several times to the Australian Medical Association for certification in Western Australia.

Those arrested were:

1. Dr. Kafeel Ahmed, aka Khalid Ahmed, born in India, driver of the Glasgow car. Taken to hospital after the attack for treatment of burns over 90% of his body surface, he died on 2 August 2007.
2. Dr. Bilal Abdullah, 27, from Iraq. Passenger in the car, he was arrested immediately at Glasgow International Airport. Convicted of conspiracy to murder and sentenced to life imprisonment with a requirement that he spend at least 32 years in jail.
3. Dr. Sabeel Ahmed, 26, born in India and brother of Kafeel (above), a doctor at Halton Hospital in Cheshire. Sentenced to 18 months imprisonment in London for withholding information he was released on time served (270 days) and deported.
4. Dr. Mohammed Asha, 26, from Jordan, a neurologist. Arrested on the M6 motorway. Acquitted of conspiracy and successfully fought deportation from the UK.
5. Marwah Dana Asha, 27, from Jordan. Wife of Mohammed Asha and arrested with him on the M6 motorway. She was later released without charge.
6. Dr. Muhamed Haneef, 27, from India and working in Australia. Distantly related and with some contact to the Ahmed brothers he was wrongly accused by the Australian police of a link to the bombing and held for 13 days without charge. In 2008, Haneef's lawyers tried and failed to get documents pertaining to the case released in Australia.
7. An unnamed 28-year-old Saudi man, arrested in Houston, Renfrewshire. Reported to be a medical student working at Royal Alexandra Hospital. Released without charge on 15 July.
8. An unnamed 25-year-old Saudi man, arrested in Houston along with unnamed 28-year-old. Also reported to be a medical student at the RAH. Released without charge on 15 July.

== Security effects ==
=== Threat level ===
These attempts resulted, on 30 June, in the threat level in the UK being raised to 'critical', the highest of five possible levels, meaning a terrorist attack was expected imminently. The raising of the threat threshold effectively put Britain on par with Iran, Guatemala, Jordan, Rwanda and Uzbekistan in terms of the potential threat posed. However, on 4 July the threat level was reduced to 'severe' but that still meant that an attack was highly likely.

=== Precautions ===
In July 2007, the visibility of policing was markedly increased, for example patrols were bolstered at Canary Wharf, home to some of the world's largest banks, police were ordered to step up 'stop and searches', and there were armed police at airports and railway stations. Further, cars have been banned from approaching airport terminals and are instead directed to outlying car parks and passengers bussed in.

== International reaction ==
On 1 July, U.N. Secretary-General Ban Ki-moon deplored the terrorist attack on Glasgow's airport and the foiled car bomb plot in London.

Also on 1 July, Michael Chertoff, United States Secretary of Homeland Security, announced that the United States alert levels would remain unchanged at orange for airports (the second highest), and at yellow nationally (the third highest).

== Future developments ==
=== Infiltration ===
Concerns have been expressed that al-Qaeda might use Caucasian operatives in the future and that they are planning to infiltrate the security services.

=== Virtual tripwire ===
A decision has been made to equip major UK airports with a 'virtual tripwire', a technology known as 'Video Analytics', the use of computers to monitor CCTV images that allows the computers to automatically summon the security authorities if pre-determined situations are detected.

=== Increased vetting of medical staff ===
Increased vetting of medical staff has been put in place as a result of these incidents. Around 90,000 of the doctors in the UK trained overseas, 2,000 of them from Iraq.
