= 2005 Indian Institute of Science shooting =

Shooting in Bangalore, India

- Date: 28 December 2005 c. 7:00 p.m. (UTC+5:30)
- Attack type: School shooting
- Weapon: Type 56 assault rifle
- Deaths: 1 (Munish Chandra Puri)
- Injuries: 4
- Perpetrator: Lashkar-e-Taiba
- No. of participants: 2

The December 2005 IISc shooting occurred on Wednesday, 28 December 2005 at the Indian Institute of Science (IISc) in the Indian city of Bangalore, killing Prof. Munish Chandra Puri of IIT Delhi and injuring four, after two or more Pakistan-based terror outfit Lashkar-e-Taiba (LeT) militants fired at Puri and others. The state government of Karnataka declared the shooting to be a terrorist attack, making it the first such attack in Bangalore.

== Shooting ==
At around 7:00 pm local time (1:30 pm GMT), two people entered the IISc campus in a white Ambassador car. At around 7:20 pm, delegates attending the International Conference on Operations Research: Applications in Infrastructure Development, organised by the Operations Research Society of India at the JN Tata Auditorium on the IISc campus, were heading to dinner when the shooting began. A gunman, wearing black mask and army uniform, started firing indiscriminately from a rifle, thought to be a Chinese Type 56, outside the auditorium.

Munish Chandra Puri, a Professor Emeritus at the mathematics department of the Indian Institute of Technology in New Delhi, was wounded by bullets. He died en route to hospital. Three other scientists and a lab assistant were among the injured. One of the injured was a pregnant woman, who sustained injuries to her eye. The other three injured had serious bullet injuries and underwent emergency surgeries.

== Investigation and trial ==
The police later recovered a Chinese made Type 56 military rifle, twelve empty cartridges, one empty magazine, five live magazines (one half-spent), two grenades, and one live hand-grenade which they defused. The police surmise that the gunmen had escaped by scaling the boundary wall of the campus. No organisation claimed responsibility.

The Karnataka police identified the attackers as belonging to a cell of the Pakistan-based terror outfit Lashkar-e-Taiba (LeT). Six people were convicted in December 2011 and several others are at large including the shooter.

In 2007, possible links arose between the shooting and Bilal Abdullah and Kafeel Ahmed, the perpetrators of two terrorist incidents that occurred in the United Kingdom that same year. Investigations were carried out to unearth these purported links.
