= Munish Chander Puri =

- Born: 15 August 1939; India
- Died: 28 December 2005 (aged 66); Bangalore, India
- Cause of death: 2005 Indian Institute of Science shooting
- Education: University of Delhi
- Occupation: Professor
- Employer: Indian Institute of Technology Delhi
- Awards: Arjuna Award

Munish Chander Puri (15 August 1939 – 28 December 2005) was Professor Emeritus of Mathematics at IIT Delhi. He was Organizing Chair, Asia Pacific Operational Research Societies (APORS). He was killed in Bangalore in the 2005 Indian Institute of Science shooting.

== Career ==
Puri did his B.Sc (Hons.) mathematics in 1960, M.Sc. mathematics in 1962 (first position) and Ph.D. in operations research in 1972 from Delhi University. He served at Hans Raj College in Delhi University until 1984 and then served at IITD until 2004. He had supervised thirteen PhD theses, nine MPhil dissertations, six MTech projects and eleven M.Sc. projects. He had written many research articles in various journals of international repute. His area of specialization, included combinatorial optimization, fractional programming, linear programming and network flow problems. He had been in the editorial board of Opsearch, an official journal of ORSI.

He was one of the founder members of the "Mathematical Programming Group (MPG)" which was started by retired Prof. R. N. Kaul, Department of Mathematics, University of Delhi in 1972. This group of researchers from various colleges of Delhi University, IITD and Indian Institute of Science Bangalore meets every Wednesday from 3 4 p.m at Delhi University to attend the seminar by some invited speakers or one of the researchers of the group. Professor Puri was one of the members who attended this weekly seminar since its inception.

Puri published 78 papers during his lifetime – 25 in Indian journals and 53 abroad.

== Indian Institute of Technology ==
Puri first joined IIT, Delhi in 1984. One of the popular undergraduate courses he taught was linear optimization.

On 29 December 2005 the Indian Institute of Technology, Delhi mourned the death of its retired professor M C Puri in shootout at Bangalore terming it as a great loss to the institute.

Addressing a condolence meeting at the institute, IIT Delhi Director D.P.Kothari said the staff and students "deeply mourn the tragic, sad and untimely demise of Prof Puri". Kothari described Puri as a "very conscientious, hard working and devoted faculty member of the institute".

Puri was an Emeritus Professor of Mathematics. He won several laurels for his work on the subject. He was one of the most senior and influential members of the Operations Research Society of India (ORSI) and he has been attending the annual convention of ORSI without fail for the past 35 years.

== Death ==
Puri was attending the International Conference on Operations Research in conjunction with the 38th Annual Convention of ORSI, which was organized by the Bangalore Chapter of ORSI from 27–29 December 2005 at J. N. Tata Auditorium, Indian Institute of Science, Bangalore, India.

At about 7 pm. after convention was over at the auditorium, Puri and three colleagues were walking towards the seminar hall of management studies for Annual General Body meeting of ORSI when suddenly bullets were fired from the back within the auditorium complex. Puri encouraged his companions to take cover after the shooting was initially mistaken for firecrackers.

Puri was a victim of the first ever terror attack in Bangalore.

== Tributes ==
Mathematical Programming Group of Delhi and Department of Mathematics of Hans Raj College organised two day Symposium Recent Advances in Optimization Theory and Applications during 27–28 October 2006, at Delhi University in memory of Puri. A commemorative volume containing selected papers of Puri entitled Combinatorial Optimization Some Aspects, edited by his students and colleagues, was also released during the symposium.

The 39th Annual Convention of ORSI was held at Heritage Institute of Technology, Kolkata during 5–7 January 2007 in memory of Puri.
