= 2007 Glasgow Airport attack =

Terrorist attack in Scotland

Coordinates: 55.864150°N 4.432120°W

Glasgow Airport attack
- The main terminal building of Glasgow Airport, shortly after the vehicle rammed into the main entrance and caught fire.
- Location: Glasgow Airport, Paisley, Renfrewshire, Scotland
- Date: 30 June 2007; 19 years ago 3:11 p.m. – 5:15 p.m. (BST)
- Target: Passengers at Glasgow Airport
- Attack type: Vehicle-ramming attack, attempted mass murder
- Deaths: 1 (one of the perpetrators)
- Injuries: 5
- Perpetrators: Bilal Abdullah and Kafeel Ahmed
- Defenders: John Smeaton; Michael Kerr; Alex McIlveen; Stephen Clarkson; Henry Lambie; Stewart Ferguson; Michael MacDonald
- Motive: Terrorism

The Glasgow Airport attack was a terrorist ramming attack which occurred on 30 June 2007, at 15:11 BST, when a dark green Jeep Cherokee loaded with propane canisters was driven at the glass doors of the Glasgow Airport terminal and set ablaze. The car's driver was severely burnt in the ensuing fire, and five members of the public were injured, none seriously. Some injuries were sustained by those assisting the police in detaining the occupants. A close link was quickly established to the 2007 London car bombs the previous day.

Both of the car's occupants were apprehended at the scene. Within three days, Scotland Yard had confirmed that eight people had been taken into custody in connection with this incident and that in London.

Police identified the two men as Bilal Abdullah, a British-born, Muslim doctor of Iraqi descent working at the Royal Alexandra Hospital, and Kafeel Ahmed, also known as Khalid Ahmed, an Indian-born engineer and the driver, who was treated for fatal burns at the same hospital. The newspaper The Australian alleged that a suicide note indicated that the two had intended to die in the attack. Kafeel Ahmed died from his injuries on 2 August. Bilal Abdullah was later found guilty of conspiracy to commit murder and was sentenced to life imprisonment with a minimum of 32 years.

The attack was the first terrorist incident to take place in Scotland since the Lockerbie bombing in 1988. It also took place three days after the appointment of Scottish MP Gordon Brown as Prime Minister of the United Kingdom, but Downing Street dismissed suggestions of a connection.

== Events ==
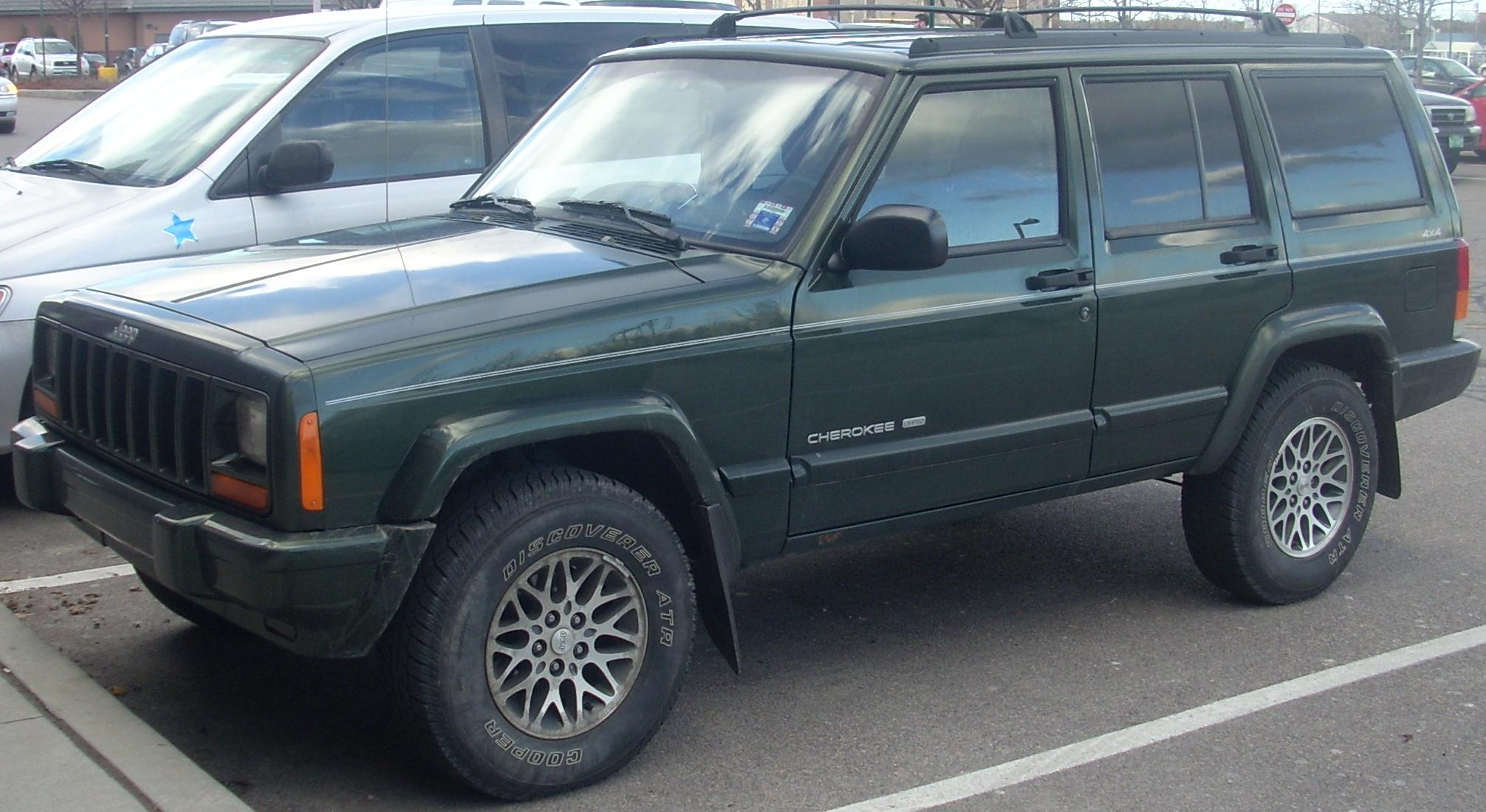
A Jeep Cherokee, similar to the one used in the attacks

A dark green Jeep Cherokee, registration number L808 RDT, travelling at a speed estimated by a witness as about 30 mph (48 km/h), struck security bollards in a terror ramming attack at the main entrance to Glasgow Airport. The vehicle was reported to have several petrol containers and propane gas canisters on board. One eyewitness said flames issued from beneath the car when it hit the building, while another eyewitness said it appeared the driver was trying to drive through the terminal doors. According to reports, the car was occupied by two "Asian-looking" men. Although the doors were damaged, security bollards outside the entrance stopped the car from entering the terminal, where there were 4,000 people, with the potential for many fatalities.

When the Jeep failed to explode, one man (later identified as Abdulla) threw petrol bombs from the passenger seat and the other (Ahmed) doused himself in petrol and set it alight. Police indicated the vehicle burst into flames when it was driven at the terminal. An eyewitness noted that a man got out of the car and began to fight with police. Another eyewitness said that the man was throwing punches and repeatedly shouting "Allah". The man was arrested and later identified as Bilal Abdullah, a UK-born doctor of Iraqi descent who was working at the Royal Alexandra Hospital. Another man exited the car and ran into the terminal building while he was on fire and began writhing on the ground, before being confronted by an airport employee, John Smeaton, who was awarded the Queen's Gallantry Medal for his heroism.

=== Immediate aftermath ===
All those injured were taken to the Royal Alexandra Hospital in nearby Paisley. During the subsequent investigation, propane gas canisters were removed from the car. A Strathclyde Police spokesman confirmed the two men in the car were arrested, one of them badly burned. The man was initially taken to Royal Alexandra Hospital in Paisley before being transferred to the intensive care unit at Glasgow Royal Infirmary due to it having a specialist burns unit, where he died on 2 August. The Jeep was removed early on the morning of 1 July, before flights resumed and the airport was partially reopened.

Royal Alexandra Hospital's accident and emergency department was evacuated and then closed when a suspected explosive device on the bomber's body was found. Affected patients were taken to the Southern General Hospital and the Western Infirmary. It later emerged the device was not explosive. The second man, Bilal Abdullah, was initially held at nearby Helen Street police station, one of the UK's high security police stations with the capability to hold terrorist suspects. He was later transferred to Paddington Green Police Station in London, along with two unnamed suspects, after the Lord Advocate Elish Angiolini gave her consent to a combined prosecution in England under English law.

In the aftermath of the attack, the airport was evacuated and all flights suspended. Evacuated holiday-goers, including some who were left in aircraft for up to ten hours after the event, were accommodated overnight in the SEC Centre. BAA indicated the airport main terminal re-opened for an incoming flight from Ibiza on 1 July 2007 at 07:37, and began handling departures from approximately 09:00.

Automatic number-plate recognition (ANPR) technology identified the vehicle of two suspects connected with the Glasgow Airport attack on the M6 motorway, between junctions 18 and 17, near Holmes Chapel, Cheshire. The police brought the vehicle to a slow halt. The suspects, medical doctor Mohammed Asha and his wife, were arrested.

== Investigation ==
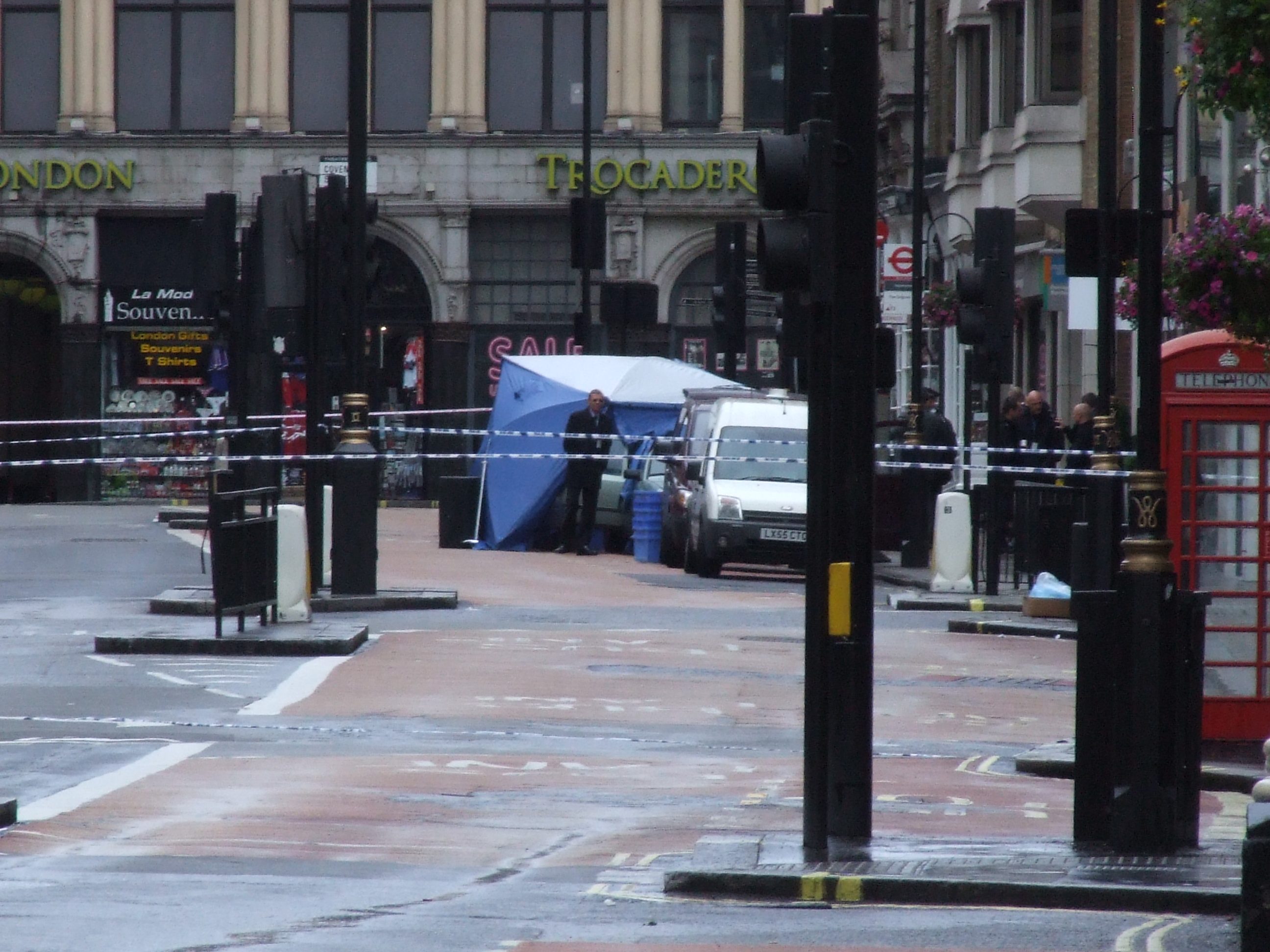
The Mercedes-Benz on Haymarket covered by a tent the day before the attacks at Glasgow

The police said they believed the attack was linked to the 2007 London car bombs 36 hours before. The vehicle was reported to have contained 60 litres of petrol, gas cylinders, and nails. Scotland Yard reported that while the gas contained in the canisters and the quantity of the canisters remains unknown, further details would be given after they were analysed by forensic experts. The head of Scotland Yard's counter-terrorism command said, "It is obvious that if the device had detonated there could have been serious injury or loss of life." The device could not have detonated, because it lacked an oxidiser, according to a columnist for The Register (UK). This information may have originated from an interview of former CIA counter-terrorism officer Larry Johnson, conducted by Keith Olbermann of MSNBC on 29 June.

According to Sky News, the gas cylinders contained propane, used for patio heaters. A second bomb was later found in a blue Mercedes-Benz 280E believed to have been left in the same area at around the same time. The illegally parked car received a parking ticket in Cockspur Street at 02:30. At about 03:30 the car was transported to the Park Lane car pound. Staff left the car in a public area after smelling petrol fumes and alerted police on hearing about the first bomb.

US officials told NBC News that three men had been identified and were believed to be from Birmingham. The network reported that one of the three men could be an associate of Dhiren Barot, an Indian convert to Islam who was sentenced to life in prison in 2006 for plotting to fill limousines with explosives similar to those found in these incidents and park them in garages beneath hotels and office complexes. Bharot also planned to attack five financial landmarks in the United States: the New York Stock Exchange and the Citigroup Center in New York City; the International Monetary Fund and the World Bank, both in Washington, D.C.; and the Prudential Building in Newark, New Jersey. Scotland Yard denied claims from a report by ABC News that police had a "crystal clear" picture of one suspect from CCTV footage.

A 27-year-old doctor from India, Mohammed Haneef was arrested at Brisbane Airport in Australia on 2 July in connection with the bombings in the UK. He was arrested while trying to board a flight with a one-way ticket to Bangalore, India, apparently to visit his newly born daughter. The arrest followed information received from the UK. The case against him collapsed and Haneef was released.

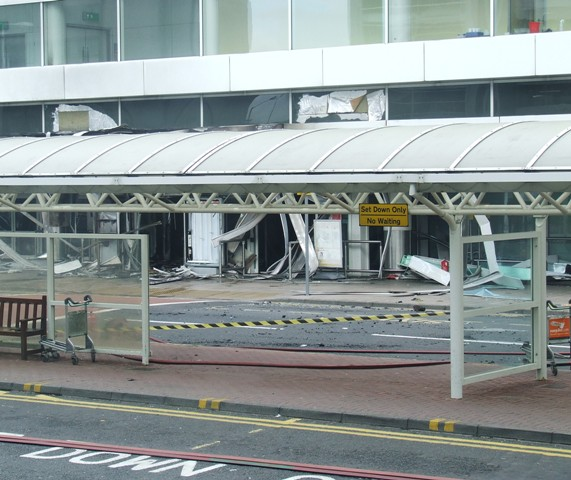
The aftermath of the bombing, 40 hours after

On the afternoon of 1 July, police carried out a controlled explosion on a car in the car park of the Royal Alexandra Hospital, where one suspect was being treated. The hospital was cordoned off for a time, and ambulances were redirected to other local hospitals. It is not clear if there was another device attached to the second car.

Police made two further arrests in Paisley in the early hours of 2 July in connection with the attack, bringing the total number of arrests to seven. At least two suspects are thought to be locum physicians reportedly working at the Royal Alexandra Hospital and at a Staffordshire hospital. These hospitals were the subject of police searches.

Also on 2 July, an eighth person was detained in Australia in connection with both the Glasgow and London attacks. Australian news reports indicated that two people in Queensland were detained for questioning. Both were doctors; one, Mohammed Asif Ali, was released after questioning with no charges being brought. The other, Mohamed Haneef, 27, graduated from the Rajiv Gandhi University of Health Sciences in India in 2002 and entered Australia due to the shortage of doctors in regional hospitals. He was working as a registrar at a Gold Coast hospital and was detained at Brisbane Airport while trying to board a one-way flight to India via Kuala Lumpur in Malaysia. His family claimed that Haneef's link to the alleged attackers was tenuous, he was not involved in the plot, and that he was returning to India to see his wife and 10-day-old daughter.

== Perpetrators ==
Bilal Abdullah and Kafeel Ahmed were identified as the main suspects behind the Glasgow attack and the car bombs discovered in London the previous day. Abdullah was the owner of the Jeep and was charged with conspiracy to cause explosions. Ahmed was hospitalised at the Glasgow Royal Infirmary in critical condition, after he suffered severe burns to 90% of his body. He was not expected to survive—he had already been revived twice as of 4 July. A suicide note left behind indicates that they intended to die in the attack.

On 2 August 2007, Strathclyde Police reported that Ahmed had died in the Glasgow Royal Infirmary. His last rituals were held in the UK. On 17 December 2009, Abdullah was convicted at Woolwich Crown Court of conspiracy to murder for the incidents in both London and Glasgow, and sentenced to life imprisonment with a requirement that he spend at least 32 years in jail.

Investigations were being carried out to unearth Abdullah and Ahmed's possible involvement with the deadly 2005 Indian Institute of Science shooting, an attack by unknown suspects still at large.

== Assistance from bystanders ==
As the incident unfolded a number of members of the public rushed to aid police as they responded and to confront the two attackers.

Michael Kerr chose to run toward the attackers despite already being out of the airport and with his family and car. He exchanged punches with one of the attackers, losing several teeth in the melee and breaking his leg.

Alex McIlveen, a taxi driver, saw what was unfolding and after approaching one of the men, famously kicked the terrorist so hard in the groin that he tore a tendon in his own foot.

Stephen Clarkson tackled Kafeel Ahmed to the ground, allowing police the opportunity to detain him and prevent any further acts of violence. Unlike some of the other intervening bystanders, Clarkson kept his identity hidden for 10 weeks following the attack, having been mourning the recent loss of his partner to cancer, and even went back to work the next day.

Retired fire fighter Henry Lambie saw the attack unfolding and rushed to help. He initially tried to put out the fire in the jeep, before then using the extinguisher to try and put out the fire Bilal Abdullah had set on himself. In doing so he helped subdue the terrorist whilst also helping to protect the two officers that were trying to arrest him. A modest man, he went home afterwards to shower, before then going out for a meal as planned with his wife and friends. He was later quoted as saying, "People have asked me if I think I'm a hero, but I don't think so. Heroes are people like soldiers who go to war, knowing what they are getting in to."

Stewart Ferguson, an off-duty policeman, saw the flaming car and having approached it began to douse the flaming Kafeel Ahmed with a fire extinguisher. Ferguson said of the incident, "I knew he was one of the bad guys, but it never entered my mind to walk away because that would have been failing in my duty. One of the primary duties of a police officer is to preserve life and it doesn't matter whose life that is. But I don't see myself as a hero."

Michael MacDonald was working at check-in when the fire alarm sounded. Having helped to shepherd people to safety he then saw one of the terrorists attacking a policeman and ran to help. He fought with Kafeel Ahmed before helping to hold him down so that he could be detained by the police. He has since stated that the incident has left him with a fear of flying.

John Smeaton, a bag handler, heard three explosions as he smoked a cigarette during his break. He ran over to help the police. Smeaton confronted and, with others, kicked Kafeel Ahmed in the groin. Ahmed later died from 90% burns following the attack. During the incident Smeaton also helped drag Michael Kerr to safety after Kerr had been left lying with a broken leg beside the burning jeep after fighting with Ahmed. Smeaton was able to capitalise on an interview given to media after the event and subsequently appeared on a number of television shows in both the UK and the US.

The incident has been described as inspiring others to take personal initiative and act decisively in a crisis. Newsagent and former policeman Mohammed Afzah cited Smeaton as inspiration for his facing down and repelling a would-be armed robber. In late July, Smeaton returned to his old job as a baggage handler at the airport. Later in the year he accepted a job as head of security at a nearby company.

Smeaton was awarded the Queen's Gallantry Medal; this was presented by The Queen at a ceremony at Buckingham Palace on 4 March 2008.

In July 2010, it was announced that seven others (Kerr, McIlveen, Clarkson, Lambie, Ferguson, MacDonald, and one of the arresting police officers, Torquil Campbell) would be awarded the Queen's Commendation for Bravery for their parts in combating the threat.

== Reactions ==
=== Scotland ===
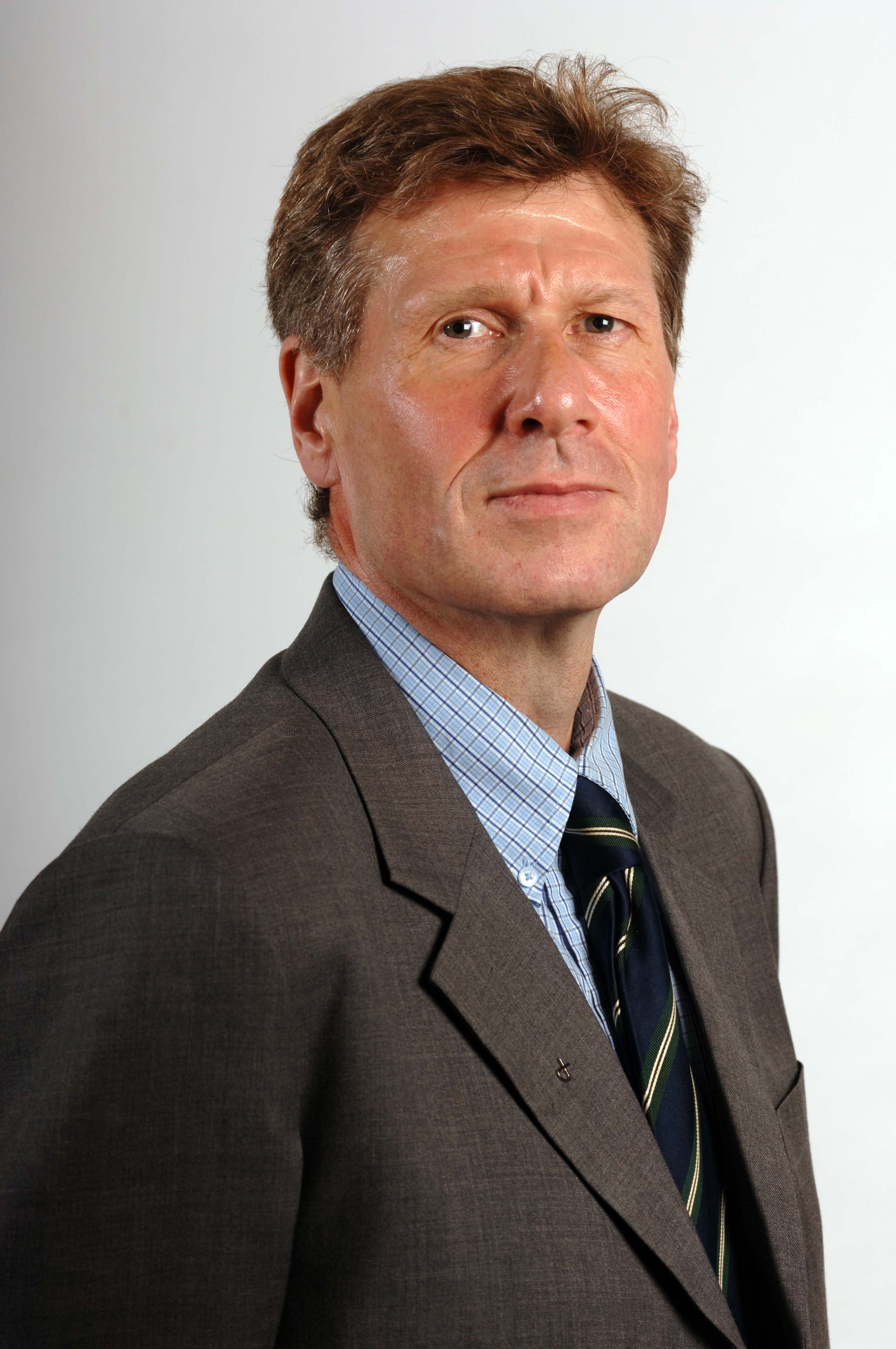
Scottish Justice Secretary Kenny MacAskill attended the UK wide emergency COBRA meeting with Gordon Brown

Scottish First Minister, Alex Salmond, along with the Cabinet Secretary for Justice, Kenny MacAskill and the Lord Advocate Elish Angiolini participated in the COBRA meeting chaired by Gordon Brown. Salmond stated that "The incident at Glasgow Airport today as well as recent events in London show that we face threats both north and south of the border—and both the Scottish and UK Governments are united in our determination to stand up to that threat to protect our communities".

Kenny MacAskill, the Cabinet Secretary for Justice, insisted that the recent terrorist attack on Glasgow Airport was not committed by 'home-grown' terrorists.

=== United Kingdom ===
The Prime Minister, Gordon Brown, was kept briefed on developments by officials. He chaired a meeting of COBRA, the government's emergency committee, on the evening of the Glasgow incident to deal with both it and the two London car bombs of the day before. He also spoke to the First Minister of Scotland Alex Salmond regarding the incident. Brown further addressed the issues by telling the media, "I know that the British people will stand together". He thanked emergency services and urged the public to remain vigilant.

==== Home Office response ====
At 20:15, the Home Secretary, Jacqui Smith, announced that the incident was being treated as a terrorist attack and that the United Kingdom terrorism threat level had been elevated from "Severe" to "Critical", meaning "further attacks are expected imminently".

On the night of the attack, Scottish television station STV was meant to broadcast a one-off programme on the soon-to-be-released movie (at the time of the incident), Die Hard 4.0, however due to the nature of the film, the decision was taken to replace the programme. National TV channel ITV changed its schedule on the night of Monday 2 July following the attack: it was to show the film Die Hard 2 (which is about terrorists attacking an airport) as the Monday evening film, but replaced it with Cliffhanger.

On 4 July, the national status was lowered from "Critical" back to "Severe".

=== International reactions ===
- United States Secretary of Homeland Security Michael Chertoff stated that "We have been in close contact with our counterparts in the U.K. regarding today's incident at the Glasgow airport and yesterday's car bomb discoveries in London. Our law enforcement and intelligence officials are closely monitoring the ongoing investigations. The senior leadership of the U.S. government has been meeting on these issues both yesterday and today. DHS and the FBI have provided updates and protective measures guidance to our state and local homeland security and law enforcement partners".
- Gordon Johndroe, a spokesperson for the United States National Security Council, told reporters that the National Security Council is "in contact with British authorities on the matter."
- Secretary-General of the United Nations Ban Ki-moon has condemned the attack and vows to fight for an end to global terrorism.

=== Security responses ===
According to the Metropolitan Police extra officers were deployed at landmarks, airports, railway stations and bus terminals across the country on Sunday with orders to increase the use of stop and search powers, while armed police were patrolling major rail stations. They also said that there would be at least 450 officers monitoring a Concert for Diana at Wembley Stadium on Sunday, 1 July in memory of Diana, Princess of Wales.

In response to both the attack on Glasgow Airport and the attempted attacks on London, security around the ongoing Wimbledon tennis championships in south-west London was increased, with the use of concrete car blockers. Security measures were also increased at the T in the Park music festival in Balado, Kinross, which took place the weekend after the attack on Glasgow Airport.

== Aftermath ==
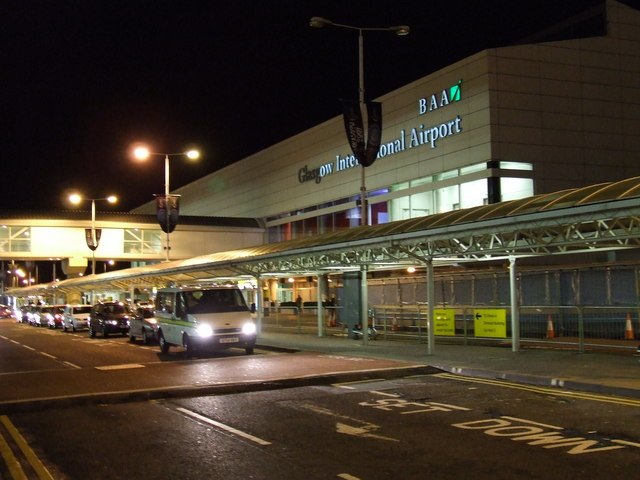
Before the attacks, vehicles were allowed to drive in front of the front terminal; after the attacks the entrance to the airport for any vehicles was blocked off.

At approximately 08:00 on 1 July 2007, the police stated that a phased reopening would begin, allowing the airport to return to normal. The first flight after the incident was due to leave at approximately 09:00. Strathclyde Police searched a number of houses in nearby Houston. At 15:10 (23 hours 59 minutes after the attack), the main terminal building (Terminal 1) re-opened. The inner lanes immediately in front of the terminal building remain off limits to all vehicles, and only authorised public transport vehicles are being allowed to use the outer lanes.

Police in Liverpool arrested one man in connection with the events in Glasgow and London, and two people were arrested by police on the M6 near Sandbach in Cheshire. Two Liverpool addresses were searched, in the Mossley Hill and Toxteth areas.

Mohammad Sarwar, MP for the nearby constituency of Glasgow Central, reported that threats had been made against the Muslim community in Scotland following the incident.

On 24 October 2008 an interview with Abu Hamza al-Muhajir, the Minister of War for the so-called Islamic State of Iraq was released by the Al-Furqan Institute for Media Production. The audio runs for a total of 44 minutes. At one point he said his group carried out its "last operation in Britain, a good part of which was launched on the (Glasgow June 2007) airport and the rest was not carried out due to a mistake made by one of the brothers.". There is support for this claim as just before the two men set off from Loch Lomond to Glasgow airport Kafeel Ahmed sent a text message to his brother Sabeel in Liverpool telling him to go to an email account. Secondly Bilal Abdulla (the other bomber) addressed his will to Abu Omar al-Baghdadi and Abu Hamza al-Muhajir, "Minister of War", who were the leader and deputy leader of al-Qaeda in Iraq There were reports that al-Muhajir personally recruited people for the plot between 2004 and 2005

=== Other airports ===
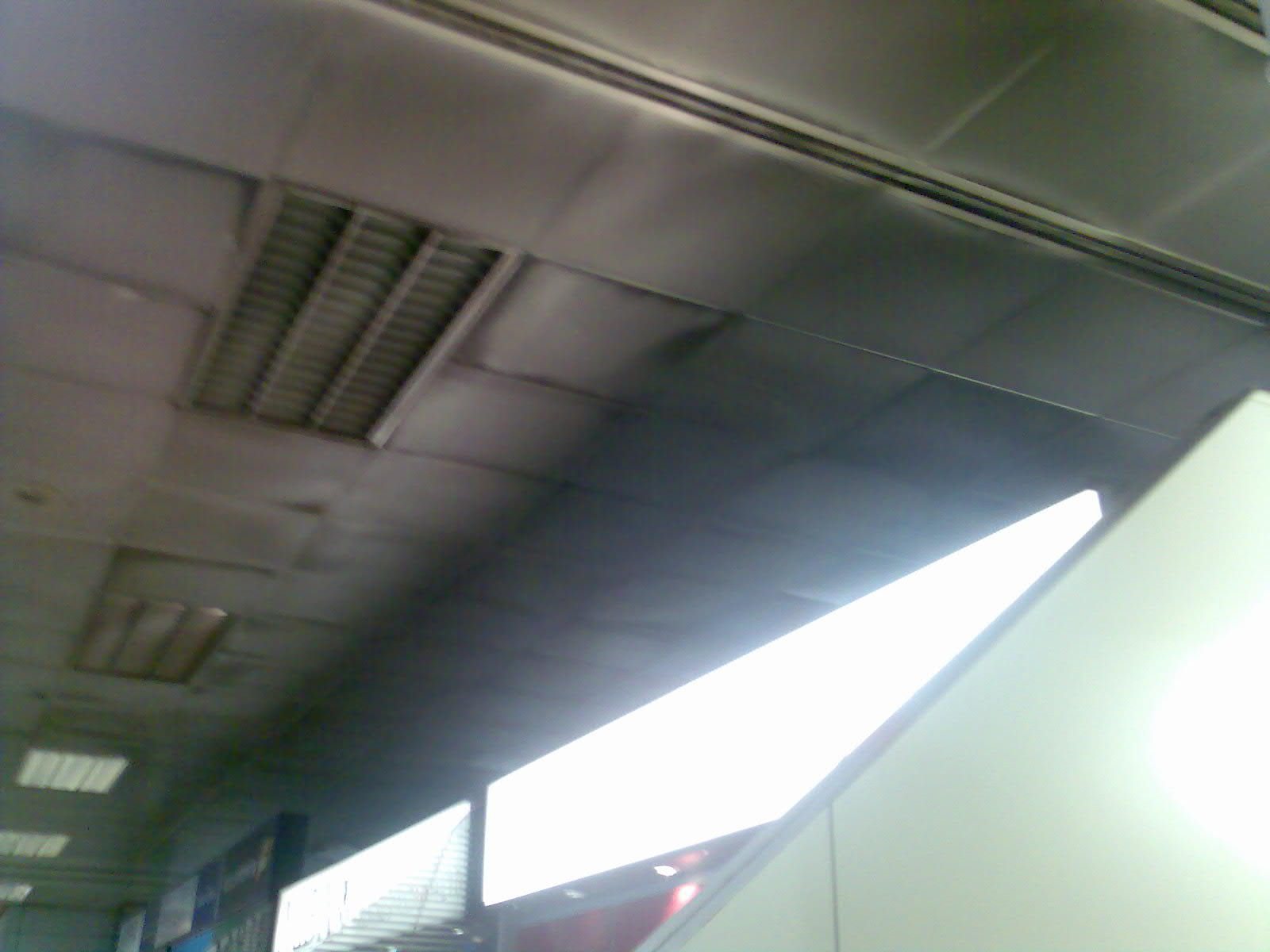
Damage caused to the terminal from the inside after the attacks.

Edinburgh, Aberdeen, Cardiff, Belfast, Birmingham, Manchester and Newcastle airports all took measures to prevent similar action by blocking off roads approaching and in front of the terminal buildings, with the terminals and blockades policed by local police forces.

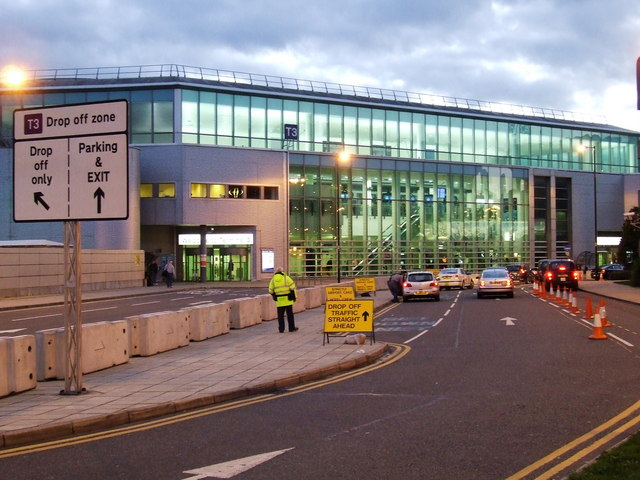
Concrete blocks protect the Terminal 3 at Manchester Airport from access by vehicles

London Luton Airport moved the taxi ranks away from the main terminal building. Blackpool International Airport was shut down temporarily. Glasgow Prestwick, the city's second airport, was kept open with armed police on site. London Heathrow Airport advised people not to bring private cars near the passenger terminals for security reasons.

On the evening of 30 June, Liverpool John Lennon Airport was closed for eight hours while a vehicle was removed and taken away for forensic testing, reopening at about 04:40 on Sunday morning.

Pearson International Airport, in Toronto, Canada increased security measures in response to the attack.

White House Press Secretary Tony Snow said that airport security in the United States would be tightened, but that the airport terror alert level would remain at its current status, "Orange" (also called "High"), where it has been since late 2006. An additional issued statement from the Homeland Security Secretary Michael Chertoff stated, "... at this point, I have seen no specific, credible information suggesting that this latest incident is connected to a threat to the United States."

An article on the website of ABC News alleged that United States law enforcement officials were informed two weeks prior to the Glasgow incident of possible attacks on "airport infrastructure or aircraft" in Scotland and the Czech Republic, leading to the placement of Federal Air Marshals on flights into and out of Glasgow and Prague.

On 1 July, the American Airlines terminal at John F. Kennedy International Airport in New York was evacuated due to a suspicious package left on the kerb.

=== Appeals for information ===
On 1 July the police asked to hear from anyone with information about the dark green Jeep Cherokee, registration number L808 RDT, and also asked for any amateur footage or photos taken of the vehicle on fire.

=== Public reaction ===
This attack, and the earlier attempt in London, were both notable as high-profile, yet substantially unsuccessful. The public reaction—particularly in the blogosphere—was amusement as much as fear.

The baggage handler John Smeaton became a minor celebrity following his actions in curbing the attack and the news interviews he gave, and was awarded the Queen's Gallantry Medal.

== In Popular Culture ==
In August 2026, it was announced that a two-part documentary following the events, Terror at the Terminal, had been commissioned by BBC Scotland.

== See also ==
- Islamic terrorism
