= Stephen Keim =

Australian barrister

Stephen Keim, SC is a Brisbane barrister who represented Indian-born doctor Mohamed Haneef in his application for judicial review of a decision to revoke his Australian visa over suspected terror-related activities. Keim is notable for his strongly principled though controversial actions throughout his successful conduct of the case, coming to public prominence by leaking to Hedley Thomas of The Australian the 142-page transcript of an interview of Haneef by the Australian Federal Police shortly after Haneef had been arrested on 2 July 2007.

Keim defended his actions publicly in an interview on 18 July, stating that

I felt really that I had no option because the public are engaged in a very important debate with regard to what the Government has done with regard to my client, and I felt that it was very important in the first instance to relate - release that document to journalists so that the evidence on which that action is being taken is available to the public, so that they can conduct that debate on real evidence and not some skewed form or view of evidence.

Keim's actions drew sharp criticism from then-Prime Minister John Howard and then-Attorney-General Philip Ruddock. Keim was also the subject of disciplinary complaints brought against him by the Commissioner of the Australian Federal Police Mick Keelty, and a Brisbane solicitor, Russell Biddle, for having leaked the transcript. At the time Keim received strong support from within the legal profession.

On 1 February 2008 Keim was cleared of the complaints by the Legal Services Commission, who, although having found that Keim had committed a technical breach of one of the rules relating to barrister's conduct, the circumstances were such that Keim ought to be exonerated. The Commission stated further that it was in the "public interest" that the complaints be dismissed. Keim responded by stating that "whether I was going to be punished, reprimanded, or struck off, I had that inner confidence that it was an honest call that I made at the time and I did the best I could."

On 19 January 2008, Keim and Peter Russo, Haneef's solicitor, were made The Weekend Australian's Australians of the Year for 2007. On 10 December 2009, Keim was awarded the Human Rights Medal for 2009 by the Australian Human Rights Commission. In announcing the award, Commission President Cathy Branson QC noted: "Stephen’s efforts throughout his life have been both bold and brave, with one high profile instance being his assiduous efforts undertaken at personal cost in 2007 when he represented Dr Haneef."

In 2010, Keim was elected as the President of the Australian human rights advocacy NGO, the Australian lawyers for human rights.
