= Al-Hesbah =

Arabic-language jihadist message board

Al-Hesbah was an Arabic-language jihadist message board and has been called "one of the most widely used jihadist Internet forums". On 17 October 2008, it was reported that four of Al Qaeda's five main websites were dismantled, and that Al Hesbah had become the only major Al Qaeda-linked website still in existence on the web.

In March 2006, the site was accused by members of the rival Jihadist forum Tajdeed of aiding in the arrest of the well-known cyber-persona of Irhabi 007, a representative of Al-Qaeda in Iraq. This led to the site administrators shutting down the site on 26 March, stating that they had discovered the identities of two members of the site who were actual security officers, Muhammad al-Zuhayri and Muhammad Tamallat.

In April 2006, the site was accused of aiding the arrests of 40 mujahideen in Saudi Arabia, drawing claims that it was either "heavily monitored", or working in actual connection with, Saudi security forces.

On 4 August 2006, the site again caught attention when it released a communique entitled How to Kill a Crusader in the Arabian Peninsula.

On 29 June 2007, the site was found to have a warning possibly related to the failed 2007 London car bombs in London, England.

On 22 October 2008, a message on the site threw support behind John McCain in the 2008 United States election.
