= Tiger Tiger (nightclub) =

British nightclub chain

Coordinates: 51.510071°N 0.13215°W

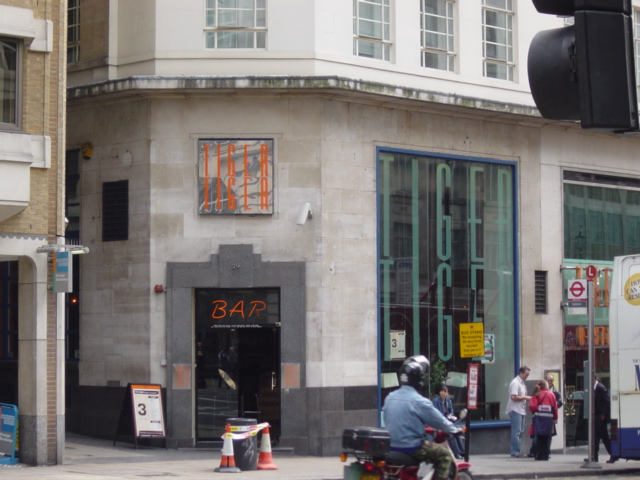
Tiger Tiger's flagship branch in Haymarket, London (2004)

Tiger Tiger is a chain of British nightclubs which is owned by Novus Leisure. The chain has a number of branches, including two venues in London. A further branch in Leeds, closed in 2018. Each branch has several bars, a restaurant and several dance floors, and its own unique décor.

The chain's flagship branch, and the first to open (in 1998), is on Haymarket in Central London. It is also the largest branch, with four floors covering some 18,000 sq ft (1,700 m^{2}) of floor space. Tiger Tiger London has one restaurant, four large dance floors and five bars. Each dance floor plays different types of music.

It was outside this club on 29 June 2007 that the first of two unsuccessful car bombs in London that day was discovered and made safe.
