= Bilal Abdullah =

English Islamic terrorist

- Born: Bilal Talal Samad Abdullah; 17 September 1980 (age 46); Aylesbury, Buckinghamshire, England
- Occupations: Doctor; terrorist
- Status: Incarcerated
- Conviction: Guilty
- Criminal charge: Conspiracy to murder
- Penalty: Life imprisonment (minimum term of 32 years)

Bilal Talal Samad Abdullah (Arabic: بلال عبد الله, Bilāl 'Abdullāh; born 17 September 1980) is one of two terrorists behind the 2007 UK terrorist incidents. He is currently serving a life sentence with a minimum of 32 years.

== Biography ==
A resident of Neuk Crescent, Houston, outside Glasgow, Bilal Abdullah was born on 17 September 1980 in Aylesbury, Buckinghamshire, where his father, also a doctor, worked. He qualified in Baghdad in 2004 and first registered as a doctor in the UK in 2006. He was given limited registration by the General Medical Council (GMC) from 5 August 2006 to 11 August 2007. He worked at the Royal Alexandra Hospital, Ward 10, in Paisley as a locum house-officer in the diabetes department, dealing with outpatients at a drop-in clinic and obstetric clinics. He had links to the Sunni Wahabist sect and radical Islamic groups, and had been disciplined for spending too much time on the Internet at the Royal Alexandra Hospital. He is also said to have come to the notice of the security service, after visiting Islamist websites.

The GMC's interim orders panel made a determination, subsequent to the Glasgow Airport attack, that Abdullah's registration should be suspended for 18 months, as an interim measure. Since Abdullah's registration was already to expire on 11 August 2007, his registration was suspended only until then.

== 2007 terrorist incidents ==
Abdullah and Kafeel Ahmed were identified as the men who planted car bombs in London on 29 June 2007 and attempted an attack at Glasgow Airport the next day. Abdullah was the passenger in, and owner of, the Jeep Cherokee that was rammed into the terminal and set ablaze. The driver, Ahmed, died from third degree burns on 2 August 2007. Abdullah was charged with conspiracy to cause explosions.

While Ahmed was aflame in the car, Abdullah reportedly attacked Sergeant Torquil Campbell at the scene, to prevent him from approaching the burning vehicle, and running back to try to open the back hatch. During the scuffle, police officer Stewart Ferguson was spraying the burning man with a fire extinguisher. Popping and banging could be heard coming from the vehicle. A suicide note left behind indicated that they intended to die in the attack.

A silver Vauxhall Astra, which was subject to a controlled explosion by police on 3 July 2007, was believed to have been rented by Abdullah.

Investigations are being carried out to unearth Ahmed's possible involvement with the deadly 2005 Indian Institute of Science shooting, an attack with unknown suspects that are still at large.

== Aftermath ==
It has been reported that his motive was to avenge the death of a friend killed in the Iraq War by a Shia death squad, hate against the West over Palestine, and that he had been radicalized by the teachings of al Qaeda and al-Zarqawi. The Islamic organization Hizb ut-Tahrir denies reports from the Telegraph that Abdullah was a member. During his own testimony during trial, Bilal said his motivation was avenging damage done to Iraq by the west through sanctions, the 1991 Gulf War (he blamed the rise of childhood leukaemia on the depleted uranium armour-piercing shells that were used), and the US and British 2003 invasion of Iraq.

== Legal proceedings ==
The trial of Bilal Abdullah, arrested at the scene of the attack, concluded in December 2008. During the trial, more details emerged of the connection between the Glasgow attack and the London car bombs. E-mail and mobile phone conversations indicated Abdullah and Kafeel Ahmed first contacted each other in February 2007. Receipts and CCTV images discovered by police showed Ahmed bought components for an improvised bomb, including nails, from hardware store B&Q. The pair were also believed to have carried out reconnaissance in London. On 28 June 2007, Ahmed and Abdullah left Scotland in the two-second-hand Mercedes vehicles and were recorded on CCTV driving to London and parking both vehicles in locations in the West End. After the bombs failed to detonate the men stayed at the Newham Hotel, Romford Road, before leaving London by train via Stansted. They were then captured again on CCTV at Johnstone railway station, near Glasgow. Returning to the "bomb factory" in Glasgow they modified the Jeep into an improvised bomb.

After filling the Jeep with explosive material, Abdullah and Ahmed left early the following morning, driving around the Loch Lomond area for several hours before attempting their failed attack on Glasgow Airport. A New York Times report on the trial refers to: 'But evidence at the trial showed that the two vehicles had failed to explode despite repeated signals from the mobile phones because of faulty assembly of the so-called fuel air bombs involved. Prosecutors said that a laptop owned by Dr. Abdullah—found in the Jeep that crashed into the air terminal—showed that the two men had studied blueprints for the bombs that they had found on Islamic extremists' Web sites. In lengthy testimony, Dr. Abdullah said he had intended only to give people in Britain "a taste of fear" and a "scare" with the bombings, not to kill people. But the chief prosecutor, Jonathan Laidlaw, said the timing of the attacks, at the height of Friday night crowds in central London, and on Glasgow airport's busiest day of the year, showed that the attackers had aimed at "committing murder on an indiscriminate and wholesale scale." On 17 December 2008, he was convicted at Woolwich Crown Court of conspiracy to murder, and sentenced to life imprisonment with a requirement that he spend at least 32 years in prison.
