= Kafeel Ahmed =

Indian terrorist

- Born: 1 January 1979; Bangalore, Karnataka, India
- Died: 2 August 2007 (aged 28); Glasgow, Scotland
- Other names: Khaled Ahmad; Khalid Ahmed
- Occupation: Engineer
- Relatives: Sabeel Ahmed (brother)

Kafeel Ahmed (1 January 1979 – 2 August 2007) was one of the two terrorists behind the 2007 UK terrorist incidents. He died after lighting himself on fire during the vehicle-ramming attack at Glasgow Airport.

== Biography ==
Ahmed was born in a Muslim family in Bangalore, India, and raised in Saudi Arabia during his doctor parents' tenure there. His brother is Sabeel Ahmed, who was also arrested in the aftermath of the attack. A suicide note left behind indicates that the passenger of the vehicle, Bilal Abdullah, and himself, intended to die in the attack.

Mobile phone records have shown that, during his 2005–2007 stay in India, Ahmed had frequent communications with Malta, the UK, Finland, Saudi Arabia and Oman. In May 2007, prior to departing to Britain from his native Bangalore, he entrusted his mother with the hard drive of his computer, which he said contained some important information on his "project." The drive was handed over to police for analysis. It was revealed that the drive contained speeches by al-Qaeda leader Osama bin Laden, propaganda against the United Kingdom and the United States, some jihadist literature and the plight of the Muslims in Iraq, Afghanistan and Chechnya. It transpired that Ahmed attentively followed campaigns in Iraq, Afghanistan and Palestine, and frequented Islamist chat rooms on the internet. Digital material found included graphic depictions of real-life occurrences of torture in Chechnya, and hundreds of bomb designs from the internet.

According to police sources, Ahmed was an engineer pursuing a PhD in computational fluid dynamics at Anglia Ruskin University, in the UK, on the topic of "Computational Approach to Ink-jet Printing of Tactile Maps." He would have earned a bachelor of mechanical engineering from India, and an M.Phil. degree in aeronautical engineering from Queen's University Belfast. As an aeronautics engineer, Ahmed worked from December 2005 to August 2006 for Infotech, an outsourcing company servicing clients such as Airbus and Boeing, before resigning abruptly. It is possible that he had access to sensitive design information about various aviation companies. He was often mistakenly referred to as a medical doctor in news reports following the Islamist terrorist incidents.

Ahmed might have been in the UK as early as September 2003. He is believed to have organised a Chechnya Day Meeting in his native city of Bangalore, in February 2006. He was a member of the Tablighi Jamaat missionary sect.

== 2007 terrorist incidents ==
Ahmed and Bilal Abdullah were identified as the men who planted car bombs in London on 29 June 2007 and attempted an attack at Glasgow Airport the next day. After the car bombs failed to explode, Ahmed doused himself in petrol and then lit himself on fire, causing burns to 90% of his body. Ahmed was arrested by Strathclyde Police (Scotland) in the aftermath of the latter incident and was hospitalised at the Glasgow Royal Infirmary in critical condition.

A Rediff news report reveals that Ahmed was planning on constructing a housing complex on the outskirts of Bangalore, where Islamic Sharia law would be forcibly implemented on residents, despite India's secular constitution and separation of religion and state. In January 2007, Kafeel had disrupted a meeting organised by a Bangalore-based organisation to discuss reform in Islam. Prior to the Glasgow attack, he had visited numerous Islamist websites, including that of the Jamaat al Dawa, the parent organisation of Islamic terrorist group Lashkar-e-Toiba which is based in Pakistan and primarily conducts Islamist terror attacks in Indian U.T. of Jammu and Kashmir.

== Death ==
On 2 August 2007, Strathclyde Police reported that Ahmed died of his injuries in the Glasgow Royal Infirmary.
