= 2007 in the United Kingdom =

Events from the year 2007 in the United Kingdom.

== Incumbents ==
- Monarch – Elizabeth II
- Prime Minister
  - Tony Blair (Labour) (until 27 June)
  - Gordon Brown (Labour) (from 27 June)

== Events ==
=== January ===
- 1 January – Doctor Who spin-off The Sarah Jane Adventures airs on CBBC television starring Elisabeth Sladen as Sarah Jane Smith.
- 3 January
  - National Express coach accident: A National Express coach from London Heathrow Airport to Aberdeen, Scotland crashes on a slip road between the M4 and the M25, killing two people and injuring thirty-six others. On 4 January, in response, National Express withdraw all 12 of their Neoplan Skyliner double-decker coaches as a precaution.
  - Celebrity Big Brother 5 is launched on Channel 4, with celebrities such as Jermaine Jackson, Dirk Benedict and Leo Sayer.
- 5 January
  - The England cricket team loses the fifth Ashes test in Sydney, Australia by 10 wickets, resulting in a 5–0 series whitewash, the first time this has occurred since the 1920–1921 Ashes Tour.
  - Jyllands-Posten Muhammad cartoons controversy: Umran Javed, a British Muslim, is found guilty at the Old Bailey, London, of inciting racial hatred at a London rally in February 2006 protesting against the publication of a cartoon in a Danish newspaper depicting Muhammad.
- 7 January
  - Bristol International Airport closes its runway due to concerns by various airlines (including easyJet and BA Connect) over the safety of landing in wet weather. This follows two days of nine airlines refusing to use the runway.
  - Laura Pearce becomes the first contestant on Channel 4 television show Deal or No Deal to win the top prize of £250,000 since the start of the show on 31 October 2005. It has taken until the 351st attempt for the top prize to be won.
- 9 January – New rules outlawing businesses from discriminating against homosexuals are held in the House of Lords, after a failed challenge by Lord Morrow of the Democratic Unionist Party.
- 10–28 January – John Reid faces mounting problems continuing from those of his predecessors including further prisoner escapes especially from open prisons and also absconding of those under Control Orders
- 10 January – Two military helicopters collide in mid-air near Market Drayton, Shropshire, killing one person and injuring three others.
- 11 January – In an unexpected move, the Bank of England raises interest rates to 5.25%, an increase of 0.25%. This is the third rise in five months, after a year of stability.
- 16 January – At the 64th Golden Globe Awards, Helen Mirren wins an award for her portrayal of Elizabeth II in The Queen and Sacha Baron Cohen for his role in Borat: Cultural Learnings of America for Make Benefit Glorious Nation of Kazakhstan. Other British winners are Hugh Laurie in House and Jeremy Irons in Elizabeth I.
- 17 January
  - It is announced that methamphetamine – otherwise known as crystal meth – will be reclassified to a Class A drug, to avert widespread use of the drug.
  - Protests are held in India and the UK against the British series of Celebrity Big Brother after Jade Goody, Danielle Lloyd and Jo O'Meara are alleged to be racially abusive to Bollywood star Shilpa Shetty.
- 18 January – The UK is hit by torrential rain and gale-force winds, part of European storm Kyrill, resulting in the deaths of at least nine people and causing havoc to public transport and electricity supplies.
- 20 January – The British-registered container ship MSC Napoli, abandoned in storm Kyrill, is deliberately grounded to prevent it sinking, leading to concern about environmental damage to Branscombe beach in Devon.
- 26 January – News International phone hacking scandal: The News of the World's royal editor Clive Goodman is jailed for four months having pleaded guilty to phone message interception charges.
- 27 January – The final edition of Grandstand, the flagship BBC sports programme, is aired after nearly 50 years on television screens.

=== February ===
- 1 February
  - Defence Secretary Des Browne announces that the UK forces in Southern Afghanistan will be boosted by 800.
  - Passenger duty for flights from the UK double.
  - Downing Street officials reveal that Tony Blair has been interviewed as a witness by police on 26 January in connection with the Cash-for-honours allegations.
- 3 February – The presence of the H5N1 virus in the avian flu outbreak at the Holton turkey plant in Suffolk is confirmed.
- 11 February
  - The British Academy Film Awards are held; winners include Helen Mirren for Best Actress.
  - The England cricket team defeat Australia to win their first overseas One-Day International trophy since 1997.
- 23 February – Grayrigg rail crash: A Virgin Trains Pendolino train derails in Cumbria, killing one person and injuring dozens more.

=== March ===
- 2 March – The Attorney General for England and Wales, Lord Goldsmith, obtains an injunction from the High Court preventing the BBC from broadcasting an item about investigations into the alleged cash for honours political scandal.
- 4 March – Two British soldiers serving with the North Atlantic Treaty Organization International Security Assistance Force in Afghanistan are killed in Helmand Province during clashes with Taliban forces.
- 5 March
  - Al-Qaeda threatens to kidnap or kill Prince Harry during his upcoming tour of duty in Iraq.
  - A search party in Ethiopia finds the vehicles belonging to five Britons kidnapped in the country.
- 7 March
  - 2007 Northern Ireland Assembly election: The DUP and Sinn Féin make gains, while their respective more moderate counterparts, the UUP and the SDLP, suffer falls in support. The election is conducted using the single transferable vote applied to six seater constituencies, each of which corresponds to a UK parliamentary seat.
  - Reform of the House of Lords: A majority of MPs express support for a fully elected House of Lords in a House of Commons vote. A smaller majority support an 80% elected, 20% appointed chamber. Other options with a lower elected component are rejected. The proposals were put forward by Leader of the House of Commons Jack Straw, who describes the votes as "a historic step forward".
  - Jonathan Evans is announced as the next Director General of MI5. Evans is currently Deputy Director-General and will take over in April following the retirement of Dame Eliza Manningham-Buller.
- 9 March – Results from the Northern Ireland Assembly election showed the DUP and Sinn Féin making gains, and ensuring that in order for direct rule to cease both parties must agree to co-operate in a powersharing Executive.
- 11 March – The Ariane 5 rocket carrying the new generation Skynet 5 military satellite system is launched successfully from Kourou in French Guiana at 22:03 GMT.
- 12 March
  - Nigel Griffiths resigns as the Deputy Leader of the House of Commons over the proposed expansion of the Trident missile program.
  - The BBC's correspondent in the Gaza Strip, Alan Johnston, who is the only foreign reporter from a major media organisation based in Gaza, is kidnapped. All the main Palestinian militant groups call for his release.
- 13 March
  - Five British Embassy workers who were kidnapped in Ethiopia twelve days ago are set free in neighbouring Eritrea.
  - A draft Climate Change Bill is published, outlining a framework for achieving a mandatory 60% cut in carbon emissions by 2050.
- 14 March – The government wins the support of the House of Commons to update the Trident missile system. There is a significant revolt within the Labour Party with two PPSs Stephen Pound and Chris Ruane resigning.
- 15 March – Sally Clark, the woman who spent four years in prison before being released in 2003 when the High Court cleared her of killing her two baby sons (victims of cot death), dies at the age of 42. On 7 November an inquest in Essex hears that she died of "acute alcohol intoxication".
- 16 March – Coroner Andrew Walker finds the death of soldier Matty Hull in the 190th Fighter Squadron, Blues and Royals friendly fire incident to have been "unlawful and criminal". The US Department of State rejects this ruling.
- 17 March
  - Pop four piece Scooch controversially wins the right to represent the United Kingdom at the Eurovision Song Contest in Helsinki, Finland. The Making Your Mind Up selection show is marred by co-host Terry Wogan announcing French songstress Cyndi Almouzni as the winner, whereas Fearne Cotton announces Scooch as winning. The final results show Scooch having received 53% compared to Cyndi's 47%.
  - The rebuilt Wembley Stadium opens, more than six years after its predecessor was closed.
- 19 March – The children's pre-school television series In the Night Garden... premieres on BBC Two.
- 21 March
  - Chancellor of the Exchequer Gordon Brown announces the 2007 budget. Major points include a cut in the basic income tax rate from 22p to 20p, the abolition of the lower 10p income tax rate, and a 2p cut in corporation tax.
  - Two British sailors die and a third is injured as a result of an accident on the nuclear submarine HMS Tireless in the Arctic Ocean.
- 23 March – 2007 Iranian arrest of Royal Navy personnel: fifteen Royal Navy servicemen operating in disputed waters are seized by Iranian authorities after inspecting a ship suspected of smuggling.
- 26 March – Northern Ireland peace process: Members of the Democratic Unionist Party and Sinn Féin, led by Ian Paisley and Gerry Adams, meet face-to face for the first time, and agree a timetable for implementing the St Andrews Agreement.
- 30 March –
  - Network Rail, the replacement for Railtrack, is fined £4 million for health and safety breaches leading to the 1999 Ladbroke Grove rail crash, in which 31 people died.
  - Mr. Bean's Holiday is released to theatres.

=== April ===
- 2 April – A smoking ban comes into effect in all enclosed public places in Wales.
- 4 April
  - President of Iran Mahmoud Ahmadinejad announces that the 15 British sailors held by Iran are to be freed as a "gift" to the United Kingdom.
  - 2007 AS Roma–Manchester United F.C. conflict: violence erupts during a UEFA Champions League game between Manchester United and AS Roma in Rome.
- 5 April – Four British soldiers are killed in a bomb blast near the Iraqi city of Basra.
- 12 April – The anchor handling tug supply vessel Bourbon Dolphin capsizes in the North Sea. Three people die and four are missing.
- 15 April – Two UK military helicopters collide near the town of Taji near Baghdad, killing two soldiers.
- 17 April – Inflation at an annual rate of 3% falls outside government target range, causing for the first time, the Governor of the Bank of England to have to write a letter to the Chancellor of the Exchequer as required by Monetary Policy Committee rules, explaining the reasons for this.
- 24 April – British anti-terrorism police arrest five people in London and one in Luton for alleged breaches of the Terrorism Act.
- 28 April – An earthquake measuring 4.3 on the richter scale strikes Kent, injuring one and causing damage to buildings.
- 30 April – A smoking ban comes into effect in all enclosed public places in Northern Ireland.

=== May ===
- May – The new Ford Mondeo goes on sale in the UK with a range of saloons, hatchbacks and estates.
- 3 May
  - Disappearance of Madeleine McCann: a three-year-old Leicestershire girl, is reported missing in Algarve, Portugal.
  - 2007 Scottish Parliament election: The SNP make big gains, a net gain of 20 seats to bring their total to 47, overtaking Labour as the largest party who go down 4 seats, bringing them to 46. The Conservatives win 17 seats, losing 1 in total; the Liberal Democrats win 16, also losing 1 in total; the Greens win 2 seats, losing 5 in total; and the Scottish Socialist Party lose all of their 6 seats. The SNP eventually form a minority government, with the Greens agreeing to supply the numbers to vote, and SNP leader Alex Salmond as First Minister.
  - 2007 National Assembly for Wales election: Labour's hopes of obtaining a full majority in the assembly are dashed when they are dealt a net loss of 4 seats, bringing them down to 26. Plaid Cymru win 15 seats, up 3; the Conservatives win 12, up 1; and the Liberal Democrats win 6, exactly level with their last result. A coalition is eventually agreed between Labour and Plaid Cymru.
  - 2007 local elections: Local elections are held in most of England and all of Scotland. The Conservatives have an overall increase of councils, councillors and vote share; while both Labour and the Liberal Democrats have an overall decrease in councils and councillors, but a slight increase in vote share. These are also the first local elections since the age of candidacy was lowered from 21 to 18, meaning this is the first time that 18-, 19- and 20-year-olds can stand as candidates in council seats.
- 4 May – Peter Tobin is convicted at the High Court in Edinburgh of murdering Polish student Angelika Kluk, whose body he hid at St Patrick's Church, Anderston, where he worked as a handyman, before fleeing to London.
- 6 May – Manchester United F.C. win their ninth Premier League title.
- 8 May – The power sharing executive in the Northern Ireland Assembly is formed.
- 9 May – The Ministry of Justice is established, reorganised from the Department for Constitutional Affairs and taking over some responsibilities from the Home Office.
- 10 May – Tony Blair announces he will step down as Prime Minister on 27 June, a move expected for some time. He asks Labour's National Executive Committee to seek a new party leader, triggering the 2007 Labour leadership election.
- 12 May – Eurovision Song Contest 2007: "Flying the Flag (For You)", the UK entry, comes joint second last in the final.
- 16 May
  - Alex Salmond is elected First Minister of Scotland in the Scottish Parliament, the first person from the Scottish National Party to hold the post. Supported by the Scottish Green Party, his party will form a minority administration.
  - The Ministry of Defence announces that Prince Harry will not be deployed in Iraq as originally planned, due to the security risks to both himself and his regiment the Blues and Royals.
- 18 May – Prince William officially opens the new Wembley Stadium.
- 19 May – Chelsea F.C. win the FA Cup with Didier Drogba's goal giving them a 1–0 victory over Manchester United in the first club game to be played at the rebuilt Wembley Stadium.
- 21 May – A fire damages the museum ship Cutty Sark in Greenwich.
- 23 May – HM Government announces a carbon emissions trading scheme, the Carbon Reduction Commitment, that will apply to hotel chains, supermarkets, banks and other large organisations.
- 24 May – Jenny Bailey becomes the first transgender mayor in the United Kingdom, in Cambridge.
- 28 May – The Foreign Office submits a formal request to the Russian Government for the extradition of ex-KGB agent Andrei Lugovoi to face charges over the poisoning of Alexander Litvinenko, his former colleague, in London.
- 29 May – The Longbridge car factory in Birmingham reopens, two years after the bankruptcy of MG Rover. The reopened factory is a scaled down operation which will initially produce only the MG TF sports car, though there are plans by the Chinese owners Nanjing Automobile to build other cars there in the future.
- 30 May – A fire at the Magnox nuclear power station in Oldbury, South Gloucestershire, forces its indefinite closure. British Nuclear Group announces that the fire has not damaged the reactor and is in a "non-nuclear" area.

=== June ===
- 1 June – The England national football team play their first match at the new Wembley Stadium, against Brazil. David Beckham is recalled after 11 months in the international wilderness and Michael Owen returns from his injury at the 2006 World Cup. The match ends 1–1.
- 13 June – The Queen awards Sir Tim Berners-Lee the Order of Merit for his pioneering work on the World Wide Web. Writer Salman Rushdie receives a knighthood, sparking protests in Iran and Pakistan.
- 14 June – The final MORI opinion poll of Tony Blair's ten years as Prime Minister shows his Labour government 3 points ahead of the Tories on 39%.
- 20 June – Scarborough F.C., who were members of the Football League from 1987 to 1999, go out of business with debts of £2.5million. The North Yorkshire side has just suffered a second successive relegation which placed them in the Northern Premier League had they managed to stay afloat.
- 24 June – At a special Labour Party conference, Gordon Brown becomes leader of the party and Prime Minister–designate, and Harriet Harman is elected deputy leader.
- 25 June – Heavy flooding devastates Sheffield and Hull, causing at least three deaths.
- 27 June – Tony Blair officially tenders his resignation as Prime Minister to The Queen, and is succeeded by Chancellor Gordon Brown. Blair becomes an envoy to the Middle East on behalf of the "Quartet" of the United Nations, United States, European Union and Russia.
- 28 June – Gordon Brown announces his new government. Jacqui Smith becomes the first female Home Secretary.
- 29 June – 2007 London car bombs: Two car bombs are uncovered in central London but are defused before they could explode.
- 30 June
  - 2007 Glasgow Airport attack: A terrorist vehicle ramming attack occurs at Glasgow Airport. There are no fatalities among the general public, but one of the perpetrators dies from injuries.
  - The third generation of the Ford Mondeo is launched.

=== July ===
- 1 July
  - A smoking ban in England comes into effect in all enclosed public places.
  - The Concert for Diana is held in memory of Diana, Princess of Wales at the new Wembley Stadium.
- 2 July
  - Michael Mullen, 21, of Leeds, is sentenced to life imprisonment for the rape and murder of his two-year-old niece Casey Leigh Mullen, who died at her home in the city on 11 February. The trial judge recommends that Mullen should serve a minimum of 35 years before being considered for parole.
  - Demolition work begins on the historic HP Sauce factory in Birmingham, which closed in May with the loss of 125 jobs and the end of more than 100 years of manufacturing when the production facility was transferred to the Netherlands.
- 6–8 July – The 2007 British Grand Prix is held at the Silverstone Circuit, and is won by Ferrari's Kimi Räikkönen with home hero Lewis Hamilton finishing third behind McLaren teammate Fernando Alonso.
- 7 July
  - The London Live Earth concert takes place at the new Wembley Stadium.
  - Computer scientist Donald Michie, 83, and his wife, biologist Anne McLaren, 80, are both killed in a car accident on the M11 motorway in Essex.
- 12 July – The first MORI opinion poll of Gordon Brown's premiership shows the Labour government 6 points ahead of the Tories on 41%.
- 18 July – Stadium MK, a 22,000-seat multi purpose stadium, is opened in Milton Keynes. Its main tenants are Milton Keynes Dons F.C.
- 19 July
  - 2007 Sedgefield by-election: Phil Wilson holds the seat for Labour.
  - 2007 Ealing Southall by-election: Virendra Sharma holds the seat for Labour.
- 22 July – Floods cause chaos in many areas of the UK, especially the counties of Gloucestershire, Warwickshire, Worcestershire and Oxfordshire, and leave hundreds homeless and thousands of vehicles stranded on major roads.
- 27 July – The Nigerian-born boxer James Oyebola is shot dead in a nightclub in London; four people are charged with his murder.

=== August ===
- 1 August – The University Campus Suffolk is established.
- 2 August – First reports emerge of the 2007 United Kingdom foot-and-mouth outbreak among cattle in Surrey.
- 9 August – French global bank BNP Paribas blocks withdrawals from three hedge funds heavily committed in subprime lending for mortgages, a contributing factor to the 2008 financial crisis.
- 22 August – Murder of Rhys Jones: 11-year-old Rhys Jones is shot dead in Croxteth, Liverpool. His death is believed to have been a random shooting carried out by a local gang.

=== September ===
- 1 September
  - The Eurovision Dance Contest is held in London.
  - The Gaming Act 1845 is repealed, meaning that, for the first time in more than 150 years, gambling debts can be enforced by the courts.
- 6 September – Murder victim Rhys Jones is buried following a funeral service at Liverpool Anglican Cathedral.
- 10 September – Television entertainer Michael Barrymore is told that he will not face charges in connection with the death of Stuart Lubbock, the man who was found dead in a swimming pool at his house more than six years ago.
- 14 September
  - Northern Rock bank obtains a liquidity support facility from the Bank of England, leading to a run on the bank.
  - Disappearance of Andrew Gosden: a Doncaster schoolboy disappears while playing truant in London, some 170 miles away; he is never found.
- 15 September – Rally driver Colin McRae and three other people are killed when their helicopter crashes near Lanark.
- 26 September – The appointment of Gordon Brown as Prime Minister and the manner in which he subsequently deals with the various crises over July and August (the discovery of two car bombs in London, Glasgow Airport attack, floods, foot and mouth, etc.) appears to have been well received with voters, as an Ipsos MORI opinion poll puts Labour at 48% with a 20-point lead over the Conservatives, sparking media reports that Brown will call an early general election within the next few weeks, which would form a term of parliament until the end of 2012.

=== October ===
- 6 October – Gordon Brown announces there will be no early general election in an interview with the BBC's Andrew Marr at Number 10, prompting the media to call him 'Bottler Brown'.
- 7 October – Buckinghamshire Chilterns University College, based at High Wycombe, gains full university status as Buckinghamshire New University.
- 15 October – Sir Menzies Campbell resigns as leader of the Liberal Democrats.
- 20 October – South Africa defeat England at the Rugby World Cup final in Stade de France, Saint-Denis.
- 31 October
  - Labour fall behind the Conservatives in a MORI opinion poll for the first time since Gordon Brown became Prime Minister due to the early election débâcle, as their 35% showing puts them five points off the top.
  - Disappearance of Madeleine McCann: a German magazine comes under fire from the British and European media and public for a satirical article about Madeleine McCann, an English child not seen since she went missing in the Algarve, Portugal, nearly six months ago.

=== November ===
- 1 November – London's Metropolitan Police Service is found guilty of endangering the public following the fatal shooting of Jean Charles de Menezes, an innocent Brazilian who officers mistook for a suicide bomber.
- 2 November – Four firefighters are killed in the Atherstone fire disaster.
- 4 November – Nigel Hastilow, the Tory candidate selected to stand in Halesowen and Rowley Regis at the next general election, resigns after coming under heavy criticism for comments in the Express and Star newspaper in which he said that Enoch Powell was "right" about his fears over immigration.
- 8–9 November – Cyclone Tilo / North Sea flood of 2007: Flood warnings are issued for the east coast of the UK as the waves are expected to overwhelm sea defences and cause extensive flooding. The storm surge however turns out to be less extreme than forecast.
- 13 November – Waterloo International closes after 13 years in service. The last Eurostar trains are the 18:09 to Paris Gare du Nord & the 18:12 to Brussels-South railway station.
- 14 November
  - High Speed 1 (section 2 of the Channel Tunnel Rail Link) from London St Pancras International to the Channel Tunnel is opened to passengers allowing Eurostar trains to travel at 186 mph (299 km/h) in the UK.
  - The UK digital television switchover begins with complete turning off of the analogue signal to the Whitehaven area.
- 16 November – Police searching a former home in Margate, Kent, of convicted murderer Peter Tobin find a body, believed to be that of Dinah McNicol, aged 18, who disappeared in 1991. It follows the discovery earlier this week of the remains of Vicky Hamilton, aged 15, who also disappeared in 1991, in a sandpit at the same property.
- 19 November – Ebbsfleet International is opened on High Speed 1, this is later than St Pancras International because the ticketing and security equipment have been transferred from Waterloo International.
- 20 November – Child benefit data scandal: HM Revenue and Customs admits that it has misplaced two computer discs which contained the records of child benefit claimants data, including bank details and National Insurance numbers, leaving up to 7.25 million households susceptible to identity theft.
- 21 November – The England national football team fail to qualify for UEFA Euro 2008 after being defeated 2–3 at Wembley Stadium by Croatia in their qualifying group. Manager Steve McClaren is sacked as a result.
- 26 November – Donorgate: Labour Party official Peter Watt resigns over loans received by the party from David Abrahams.
- 29 November – Following a cold case review by West Midlands Police, a 70-year-old man serving a life sentence for another murder is remanded in custody charged with the 1961 murder of Jacqueline Thomas, a Birmingham teenager.

=== December ===
- 13 December – Gordon Brown turns up late to the signing of the Treaty of Lisbon, prompting criticism from the media. The Sun reports that Brown's late arrival was intended to 'snub' other EU leaders, contradicting Number 10's line of a diary conflict; Brown had attended a pre-arranged House of Commons liaison committee that morning.
- 14 December – Fabio Capello, the former 61-year-old Italian coach of Spanish side Real Madrid, is appointed by the Football Association to take charge of the England team from January 2008. Capello will be the second foreign manager to take charge of the England team, after Sven-Göran Eriksson.
- 18 December – Nick Clegg wins the 2007 Liberal Democrats leadership election.
- 19 December – The Confederation of British Industry reveals disappointing retail sales for the first two weeks of the month, sparking fears that the UK is on the verge of its first recession since the early 1990s.
- 29 December – Phil O'Donnell, the 35-year-old Motherwell footballer, dies from a heart attack in a Scottish Premier League fixture. O'Donnell was capped for Scotland once in 1993, and was also part of the Celtic side that won the Scottish league title in the 1997–98 season.

=== Undated ===
- the UK's first zero-carbon house, The Lighthouse, is built by architects Sheppard Robson at Watford.
- The UK RumFest is initially launched.

== Publications ==
- Iain Banks' novel The Steep Approach to Garbadale.
- Ian McEwan's novella On Chesil Beach.
- Terry Pratchett's Discworld novel Making Money.
- J. K. Rowling's last Harry Potter novel Harry Potter and the Deathly Hallows.

== Births ==
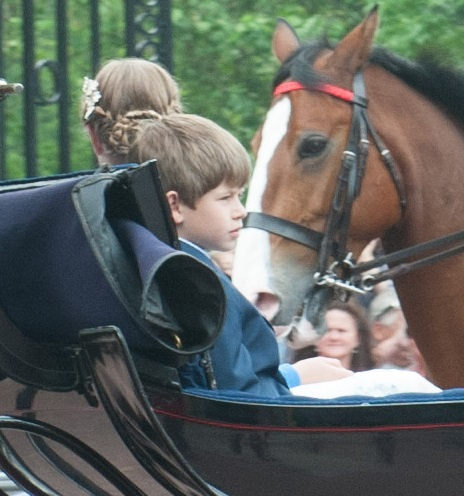
James, Viscount Severn

- 21 January – Luke Littler, darts player
- 5 March – Roman Griffin Davis, actor
- 12 March – Xan Windsor, Lord Culloden, elder child of the Earl and Countess of Ulster
- 17 December – James (Viscount Severn, later Earl of Wessex), son of Prince Edward and Sophie (Earl and Countess of Wessex, later Duke and Duchess of Edinburgh)

== Deaths ==
=== January ===
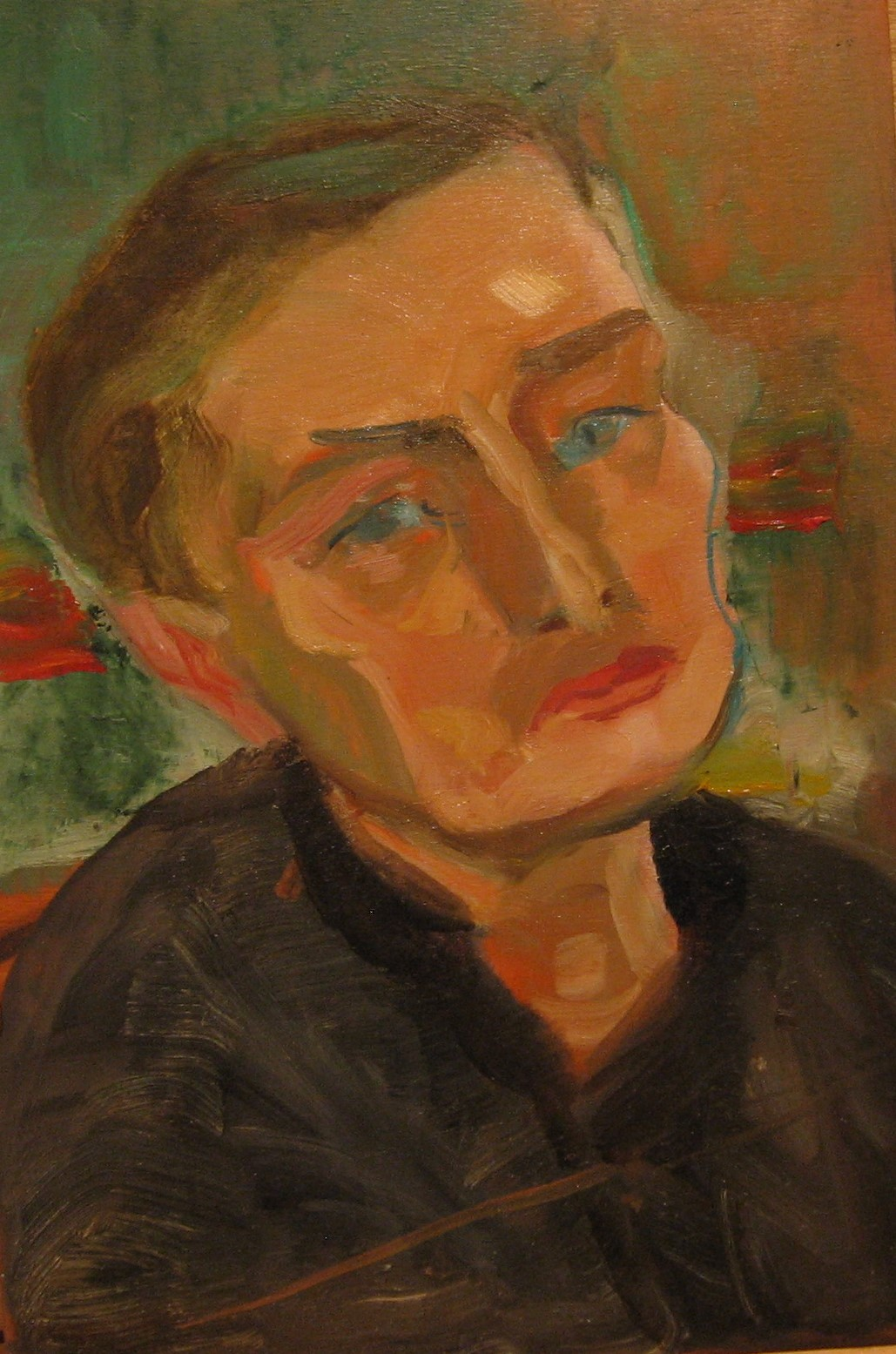
Stephen Gilbert

- 3 January – Sir Cecil Walker, Ulster Unionist Member of Parliament for North Belfast (1983–2001) (born 1924)
- 4 January
  - Sir Lewis Hodges, air marshal and pilot (born 1918)
  - Grenfell (Gren) Jones, newspaper cartoonist (born 1934)
- 7 January – Magnus Magnusson, journalist and broadcaster (Mastermind) (born 1929), cancer.
- 8 January
  - Arthur Cockfield, Baron Cockfield, politician and European Commissioner (born 1916)
  - David Ervine, leader of the Progressive Unionist Party (born 1953)
- 10 January – Harry Horse, cartoonist (born 1960); suicide
- 11 January
  - Tudor Gates, screenwriter and trade unionist (born 1930)
  - Bryan Pearce, painter (born 1929)
- 12 January – Stephen Gilbert, painter (born 1910)
- 14 January – Peter Prendergast, Welsh painter (born 1946)
- 15 January
  - Barbara Kelly, Canadian-born actress (What's My Line?) (born 1923)
  - Colin Thurston, record producer (born 1947)
- 17 January – Ralph Henstock, mathematician (born 1923)
- 20 January – Sir David Mostyn, Army general (born 1928)
- 21 January – Myrtle Devenish, Welsh actress (born 1912)
- 22 January – Victoria Hopper, Canadian-born actress (born 1909)
- 23 January – Wally Ridley, record producer and songwriter (born 1913)
- 27 January – Paul Channon, Baron Kelvedon, politician, President of the Board of Trade (1986–1987) and Secretary of State for Transport (1987–1989) (born 1935)
- 28 January
  - Malcolm Bowie, academic, Master of Christ's College, Cambridge (2002–2006) (born 1943)
  - Cyril Demarne, World War II firefighter (born 1905)
  - Johnny Williams, boxer (born 1926)
- 30 January – Griffith Jones, actor (born 1910)

=== February ===
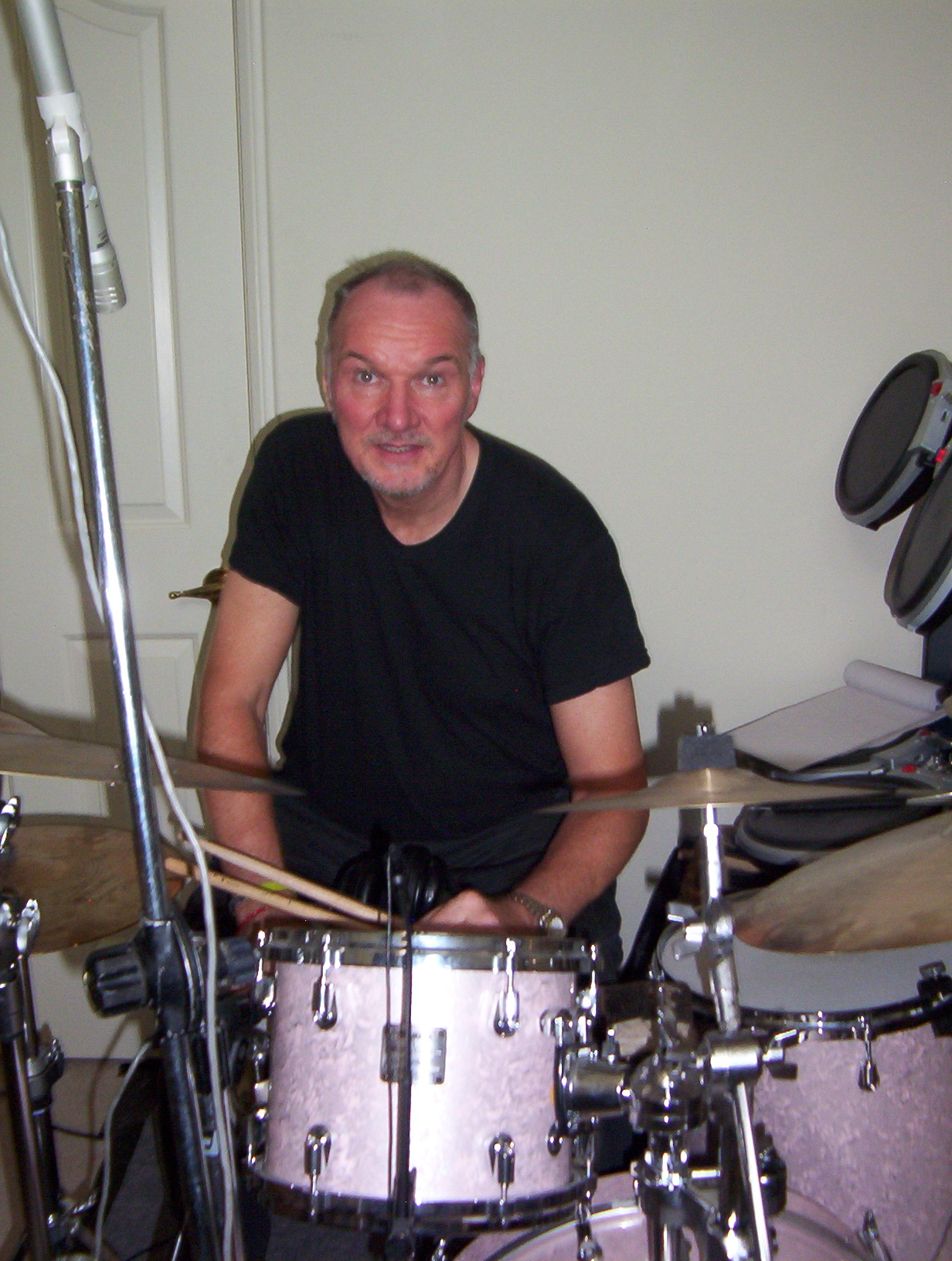
Ian Wallace

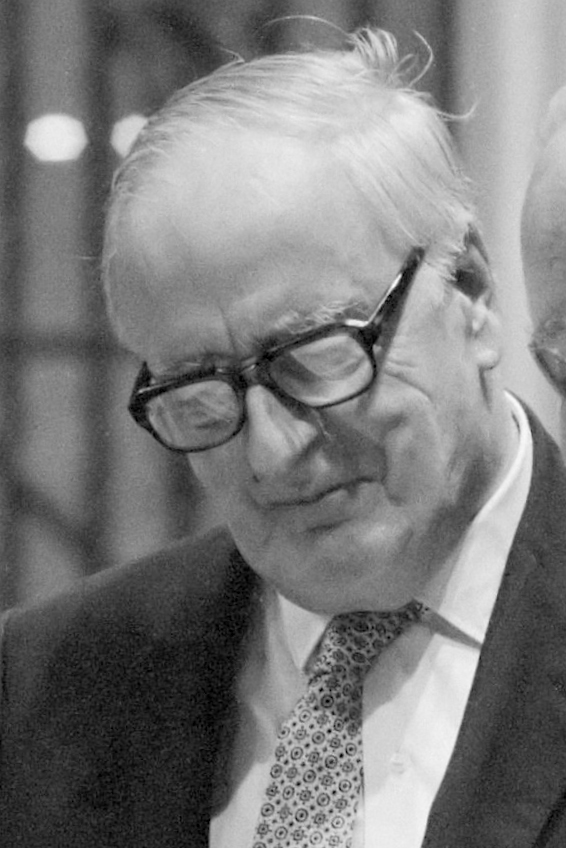
Alexander King

- 4 February – Paul Burwell, percussionist (born 1949)
- 6 February
  - Dick Allen, film editor (born 1944)
  - Gareth Roberts, physicist (born 1940)
  - Harry Webster, automotive engineer (born 1917)
- 9 February – Ian Richardson, actor (born 1934)
- 11 February – Derek Gardner, painter (born 1914)
- 12 February – Joseph McKeown, photojournalist (born 1925); killed in fall
- 13 February
  - Sir Charles Harington, Army general (born 1910)
  - Sir Richard Gordon Wakeford, RAF air marshal (born 1922)
- 14 February
  - Gareth Morris, flautist and music teacher (born 1920)
  - John Penn, architect (born 1921)
  - Steven Pimlott, theatre director (born 1953)
- 15 February – Stephen Gardiner, architect (born 1924)
- 16 February – Sheridan Morley, theatre critic (born 1941)
- 20 February
  - Sir John Akehurst, Army general (born 1930)
  - Sir Edward Gordon "Tap" Jones, RAF air marshal (born 1914)
  - Kenneth Steer, archaeologist (born 1913)
  - Derek Waring, actor (born 1927)
- 22 February
  - Edgar Evans, operatic tenor (born 1912)
  - Ian Wallace, rock drummer (King Crimson) (born 1946)
- 24 February
  - Bryan Balkwill, orchestral conductor (born 1922)
  - Alex Henshaw, test pilot (born 1912)
- 26 February – Lena Jeger, Baroness Jeger, Labour politician (born 1915)
- 28 February
  - Julian Budden, opera scholar (born 1924)
  - Charles Forte, Baron Forte, hotelier (born 1908, Italy)
  - Alexander King, chemist (born 1909)
  - John Smith, banker, politician and founder of the Landmark Trust (born 1923)

=== March ===
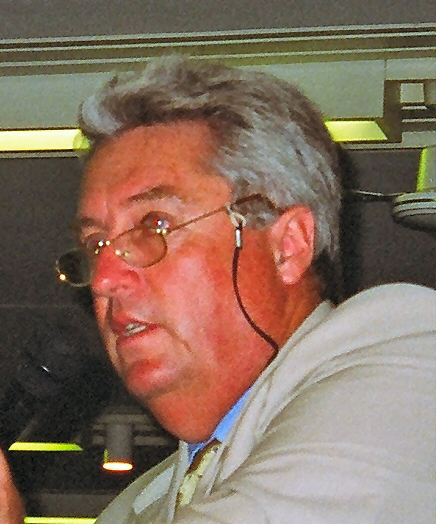
Bob Woolmer

- 3 March – Zdeňka Pokorná, exiled dissident (born 1905, Austria-Hungary)
- 4 March
  - Richard Joseph, video game composer (born 1953)
  - Ian Wooldridge, sports journalist (born 1932)
- 7 March
  - Neil North, actor (born 1932, British India)
  - Carla Thorneycroft, Lady Thorneycroft, philanthropist (born 1914)
- 8 March – John Inman, actor (born 1935)
- 13 March
  - Terry Major-Ball, banker and author, brother of former Prime Minister John Major (born 1932)
  - John McHardy Sinclair, linguist (born 1933)
- 14 March
  - Tommy Cavanagh, former footballer and football manager (born 1928)
  - Gareth Hunt, actor (born 1942)
- 15 March – William Watson, art historian and sinologist (born 1917)
- 16 March
  - Sally Clark, lawyer and victim of a miscarriage of justice (born 1964)
  - Sir Arthur Marshall, aviation pioneer and businessman (born 1903)
- 17 March – Freddie Francis, cinematographer and film director (born 1917)
- 18 March – Bob Woolmer, cricketer and cricket coach (born 1948); died suddenly in Jamaica
- 24 March – Maurice Flitcroft, golfer (born 1929)
- 26 March – Cha Burns, Scottish guitarist (The Silencers) (born 1957)
- 28 March – Sir Thomas Hetherington, barrister (born 1926)
- 29 March – Howard Goorney, actor (born 1921)
- 30 March
  - Fay Coyle, former footballer (born 1933)
  - Michael Dibdin, crime writer (born 1947)
  - Dave Martin, screenwriter (born 1935), lung cancer.
- 31 March – Phil Cordell, musician (born 1947)

=== April ===
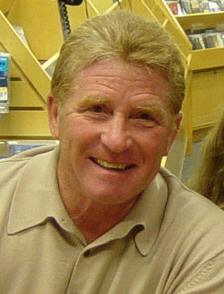
Alan Ball

- 1 April – Josef Hirsch Dunner, rabbi (born 1913 in Germany)
- 2 April
  - Janet Bloomfield, campaigner, Chair of the Campaign for Nuclear Disarmament (1993–1996) (born 1953)
  - George Sewell, actor (born 1924)
- 3 April
  - Marion Eames, novelist (The Secret Room) (born 1921)
  - Sir Walter Luttrell, Army colonel and public servant (born 1919)
  - Robin Montgomerie-Charrington, motor racing driver (1952 Grand Prix) (born 1915)
- 4 April – Terry Hall, ventriloquist (born 1926)
- 6 April
  - Colin Graham, opera, theatre and television director (born 1931)
  - Jill McGown, mystery novel writer (born 1947)
  - Jeff Uren, racing driver (born 1925)
- 7 April – Neville Duke, World War II air ace (born 1922)
- 9 April
  - Bob Coats, economic historian (born 1924)
  - Michael Fox, judge, Lord Justice of Appeal (1981–1992) (born 1921)
  - Philip Mayne, Army officer, last surviving British officer of World War I (born 1899)
- 12 April – Len Hill, Welsh cricketer (born 1941)
- 16 April – Robert Jones, Conservative politician (born 1950)
- 19 April – Anthony Brooks, World War II soldier and spy (born 1922)
- 22 April – Sir Raymond Hoffenberg, endocrinologist (born 1923, South Africa)
- 25 April
  - Edward Astley, 22nd Baron Hastings, peer (born 1912)
  - Alan Ball, former footballer and football manager (born 1945)
  - Les Jackson, cricketer (Derbyshire) (born 1921)
  - Arthur Milton, cricketer and footballer, last person to play in both England's cricket and football teams (born 1928)
- 26 April – Lindsey Hughes, historian of Russia (born 1949)
- 27 April – Al Hunter Ashton, actor and scriptwriter (born 1957)
- 29 April – Sir George Pinker, obstetrician and gynaecologist (born 1924)

=== May ===
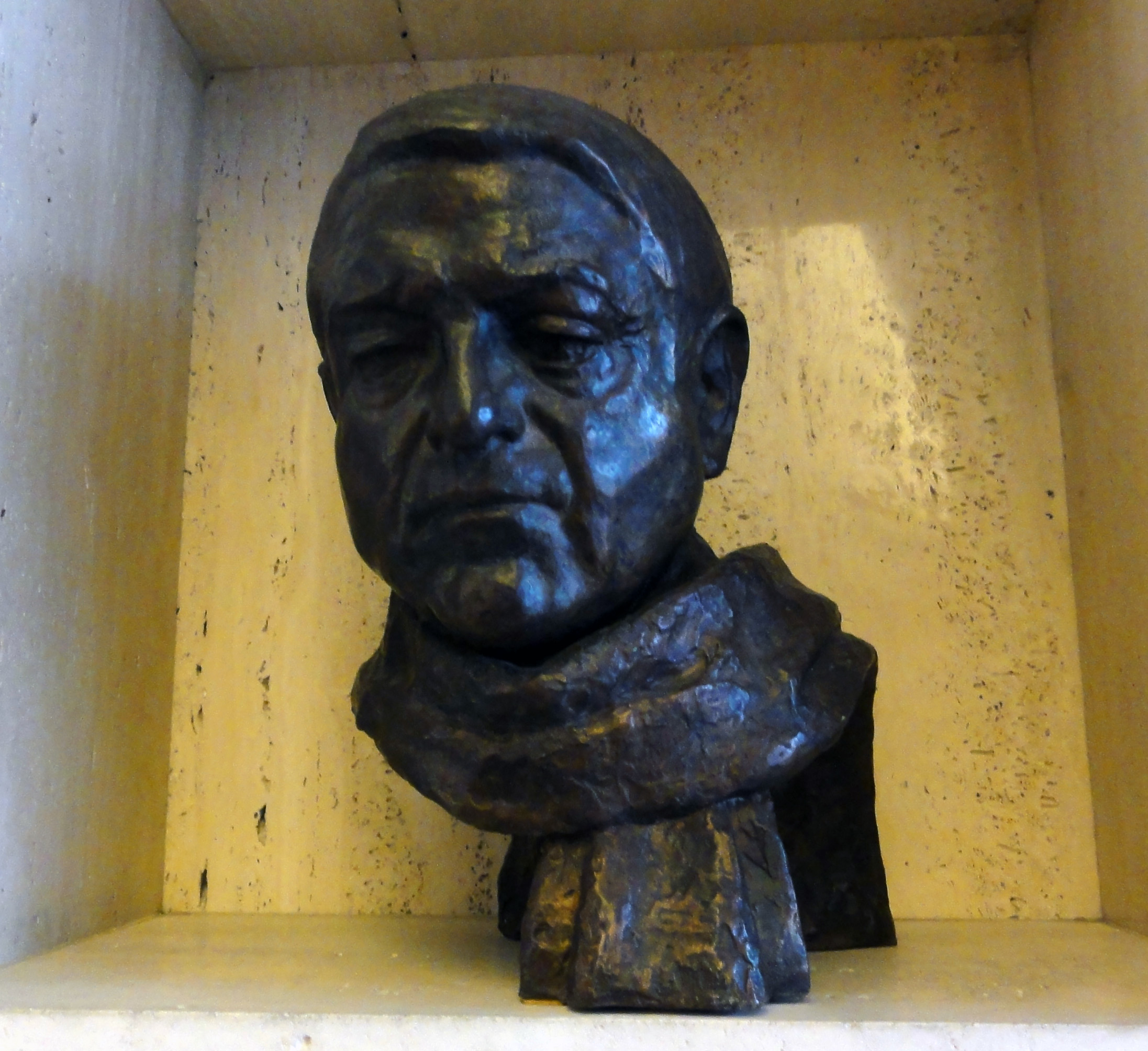
Colin St John Wilson

- 1 May – Winifred Pennington, limnologist (born 1915)
- 5 May – John Zamet, periodontist (born 1932)
- 6 May
  - Lesley Blanch, writer and fashion editor (born 1904)
  - Bernard Weatherill, Baron Weatherill, politician, Speaker of the House of Commons (1983–1992) (born 1920)
- 7 May – Isabella Blow, fashion journalist (born 1958); suicide
- 10 May – Sir Oliver Millar, art historian, Surveyor of the Queen's Pictures (1972–1988) and Director of the Royal Collection (1987–1988) (born 1923)
- 14 May – Sir Colin St John Wilson, architect, designer of the British Library (born 1922)
- 15 May – Angus McBride, illustrator (born 1931)
- 16 May – Dame Mary Douglas, social anthropologist (born 1921)
- 19 May – Derek Cooper, Army officer and campaigner for refugees (born 1912)
- 20 May – Sir George MacFarlane, engineer (born 1916)
- 24 May – David Renton, Baron Renton, politician and life peer (born 1908)
- 26 May
  - Sir James Baird, Army lieutenant-general (born 1915)
  - Phyllis Sellick, pianist (born 1911)
  - Aubrey Singer, television executive (born 1927)
- 27 May – Edward Behr, journalist and author (born 1926)
- 28 May – John Macquarrie, theologian and Anglican priest (born 1919)
- 29 May – Michael John Seaton, astronomer (born 1923)

=== June ===
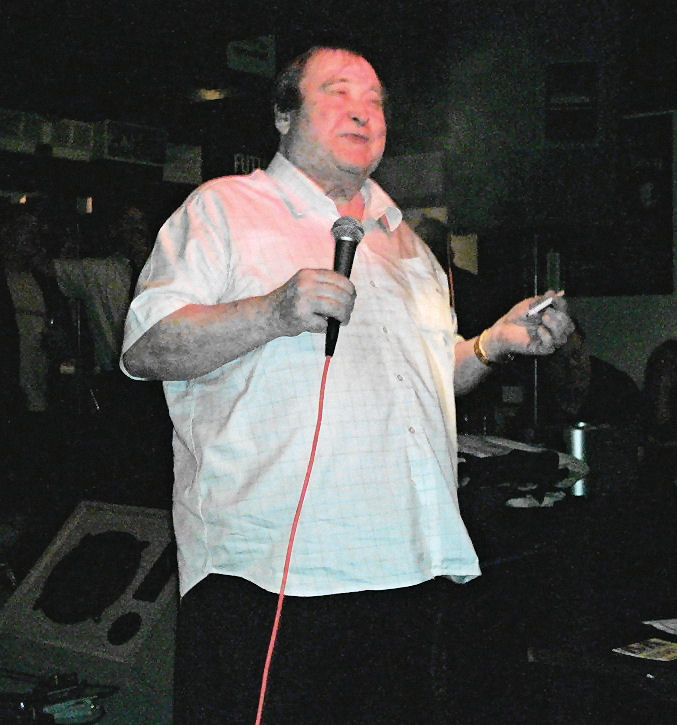
Bernard Manning

- 1 June – Sir John Gilmour, 3rd Baronet, politician (born 1912)
- 4 June
  - Lady Jeanne Campbell, journalist (born 1928)
  - Wallace McIntosh, World War II airman (born 1920)
- 7 June – Michael Hamburger, poet and translator (born 1924, Germany)
- 9 June –
  - Harry Ewing, Baron Ewing of Kirkford, politician (born 1931)
  - Leonard E. H. Williams, World War II Spitfire pilot and businessman (born 1919)
- 11 June – Jonathan Henry, police officer (born 1971); murdered on duty
- 12 June – Wally Herbert, polar explorer (born 1934)
- 13 June
  - Sir David Hatch, radio broadcaster and actor (born 1939)
  - John Stanton Ward, artist (born 1917)
- 14 June – Peter Ucko, archaeologist (born 1938)
- 18 June – Bernard Manning, comedian (born 1930)
- 19 June
  - Tommy Eytle, actor and calypso musician (born 1926, Guyana)
  - Piara Khabra, Labour politician (born 1921, India)
- 22 June
  - Gillian Baverstock, novelist and daughter of Enid Blyton (born 1931)
  - Jack Ormston, motorcycle speedway rider (born 1909)
- 24 June
  - Derek Dougan, footballer (Wolverhampton Wanderers) (born 1938)
  - Maurice Wood, Anglican prelate, Bishop of Norwich (1971–1985) (born 1916)
- 25 June – Brenda Rawnsley, arts campaigner (born 1916)
- 26 June – Dame Thea King, clarinettist (born 1925)
- 27 June
  - Kari Blackburn, journalist (born 1954); suicide
  - Hugh Johns, sports commentator (born 1922)
- 28 June – Maurice Wohl, philanthropist (born 1917)

=== July ===
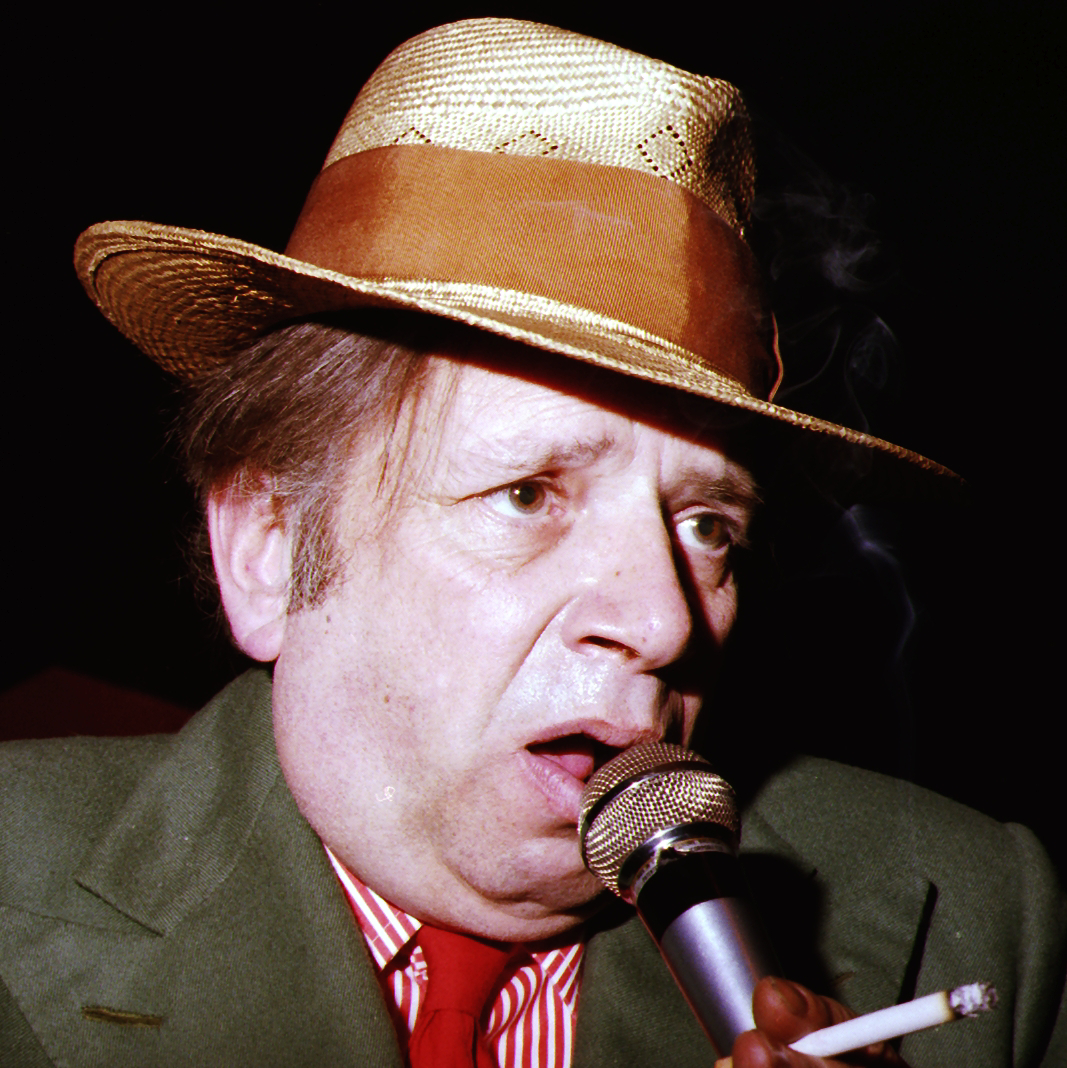
George Melly

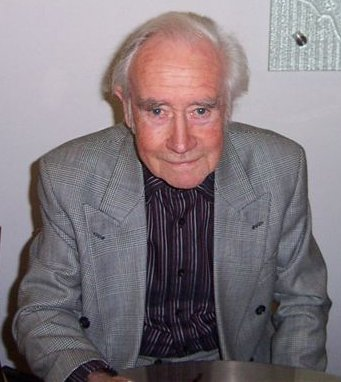
Peter Tuddenham

- 2 July – John Pinches, rower and soldier (born 1916)
- 3 July – Dave Simmons, English footballer (Colchester United) (born 1948)
- 5 July – George Melly, jazz singer (born 1926)
- 7 July
  - Ion Calvocoressi, Army officer and stockbroker (born 1919, India)
  - Anne McLaren, geneticist and developmental biologist (born 1927); car accident
  - Donald Michie, researcher in artificial intelligence (born 1923, Burma); car accident
  - Jack Odell, inventor and co-founder of Matchbox Toys (born 1920)
- 9 July
  - Penny Thomson, film producer (born 1950)
  - Peter Tuddenham, voice actor (born 1918)
- 10 July – Edward Lowbury, bacteriologist (born 1913)
- 11 July – Timothy Sprigge, philosopher (born 1932)
- 12 July
  - Allen Clarke, educationalist (born 1910)
  - Nigel Dempster, journalist (born 1941)
- 13 July – Frank Maher, stuntman (born 1929)
- 14 July
  - Eva Crackles, botanist (born 1918)
  - Bernard Pagel, astrophysicist (born 1930)
  - John Warrender, 2nd Baron Bruntisfield, peer and politician (born 1921)
- 15 July – Kelly Johnson, guitarist (Girlschool) (born 1958)
- 16 July
  - Angus Allan, comic strip writer (born 1936)
  - Alan Shepherd, motorcycle racer (born 1935)
- 18 July – Charles Wylie, Army lieutenant-colonel and organizer of the 1953 British Mount Everest expedition (born 1919)
- 20 July
  - Ollie Bridewell, motorcycle racer (born 1985); accident while practising
  - Ivor Emmanuel, actor (born 1927)
- 21 July – Don Arden, music manager (born 1926)
- 22 July – John Harrison Burnett, academic, vice-chancellor of the University of Edinburgh (1979–1987) (born 1922)
- 24 July
  - Geoffrey Nuttall, ecclesiastical historian (born 1911)
  - Charles Whiting, military historian (born 1926)
  - William Young, World War I veteran (born 1900)
- 25 July – Raymond Bristow, Anglican priest (born 1906)
- 27 July – James Oyebola, boxer (born 1961, Nigeria); murdered
- 29 July
  - Ian Anstruther, baronet, diplomat and writer (born 1922)
  - Phil Drabble, author and television presenter (born 1914)
  - Mike Reid, comedian and actor (born 1940)
- 31 July
  - Norman Cohn, historian (born 1915)
  - R. D. Wingfield, novelist and radio dramatist (born 1928)

=== August ===
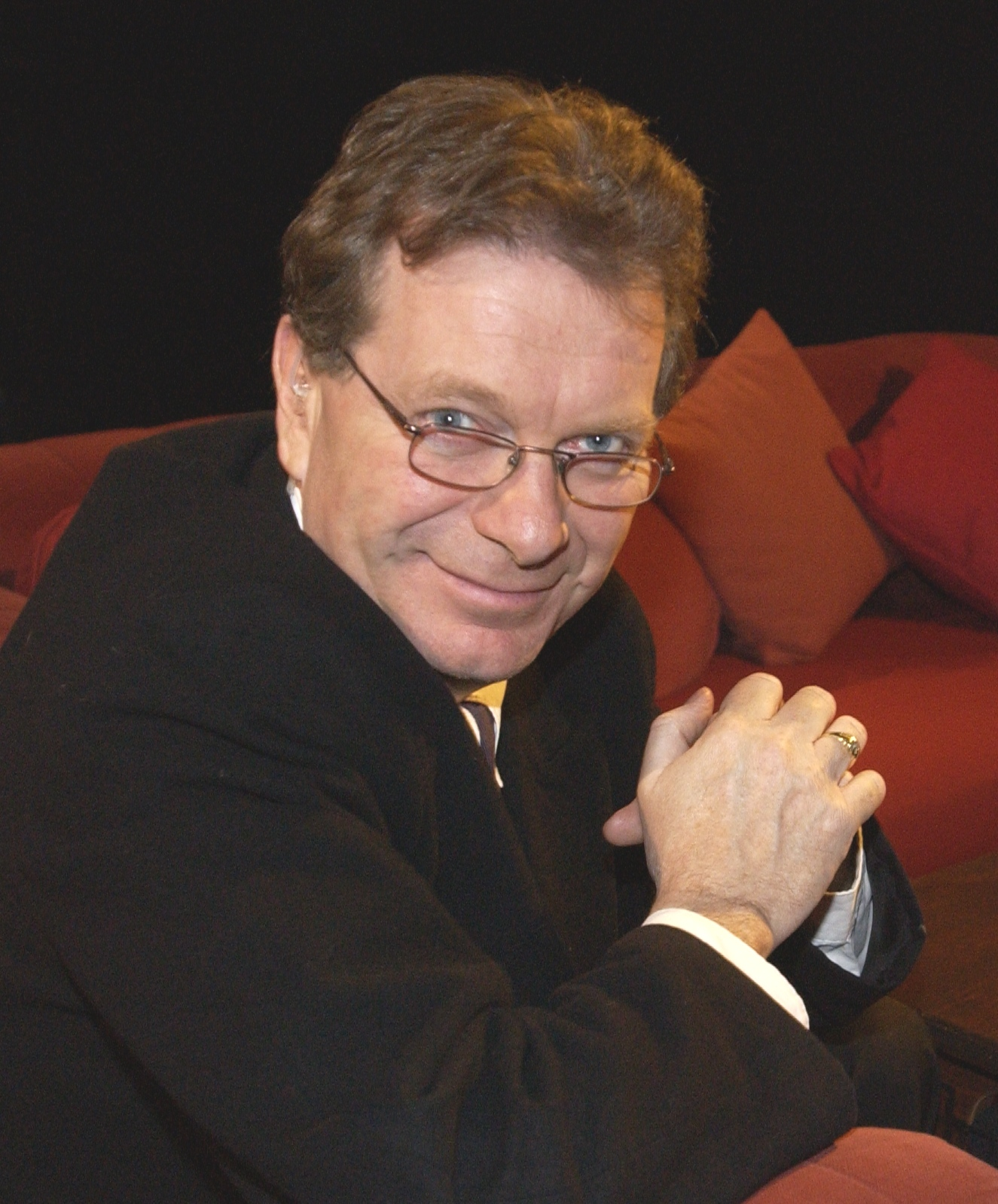
Tony Wilson

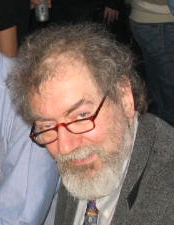
Michael Jackson

- 3 August – John Gardner, writer of thrillers (born 1926)
- 5 August
  - Paul Rutherford, trombonist (born 1940)
  - Peter Graham Scott, film producer (born 1923)
- 9 August – Timothy Garden, Baron Garden, RAF pilot and politician (born 1944)
- 10 August – Tony Wilson, broadcaster, nightclub manager, and record label owner (born 1950)
- 13 August – Tim Royes, music director and editor (born 1964); car accident
- 14 August – John Biffen, Baron Biffen, politician (born 1930)
- 15 August – Richard Bradshaw, orchestral conductor, General Director of the Canadian Opera Company (born 1944)
- 16 August
  - William Edwards, Labour politician (born 1938)
  - Clive Exton, television and film writer (born 1930)
  - Roland Mathias, poet and literary critic (born 1915)
- 17 August
  - Bill Deedes, journalist, editor of The Daily Telegraph (1974–1986) and politician (born 1913)
  - Alison Plowden, historian (born 1931)
- 18 August
  - Stephen Bicknell, organ builder and writer about pipe organs (born 1957)
  - Magdalen Nabb, author (born 1947)
- 21 August – Siobhan Dowd, writer and activist (born 1960)
- 24 August – Adam Watson, diplomat and academic (born 1914)
- 25 August
  - Richard Cook, jazz writer (born 1957)
  - Ray Jones, footballer (born 1988); car accident
- 30 August
  - Michael Jackson, beer writer (born 1942)
  - John Wedgwood, physician (born 1919)
- 31 August – James Brian Tait, World War II pilot (born 1916)

=== September ===
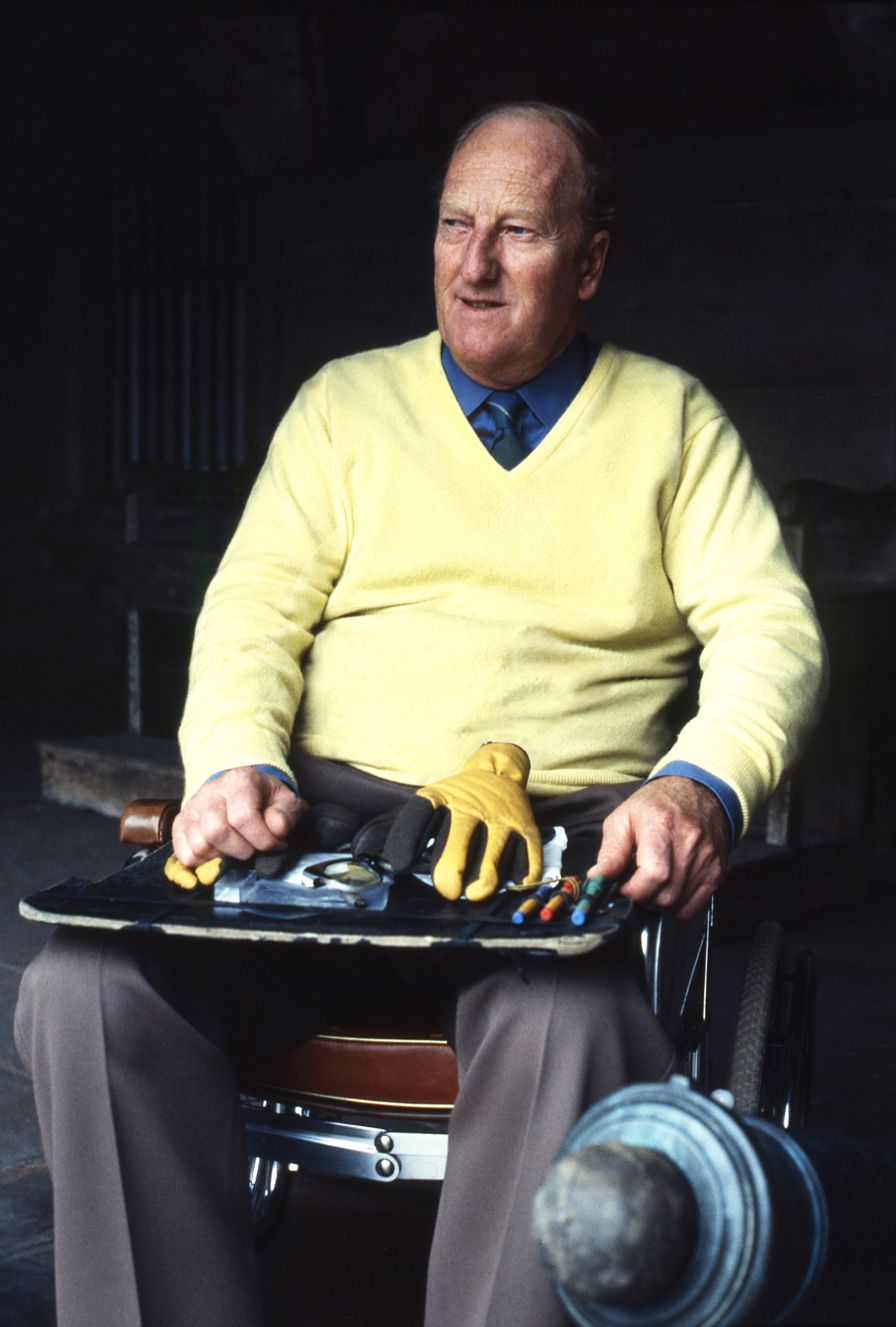
9th Duke of Buccleuch

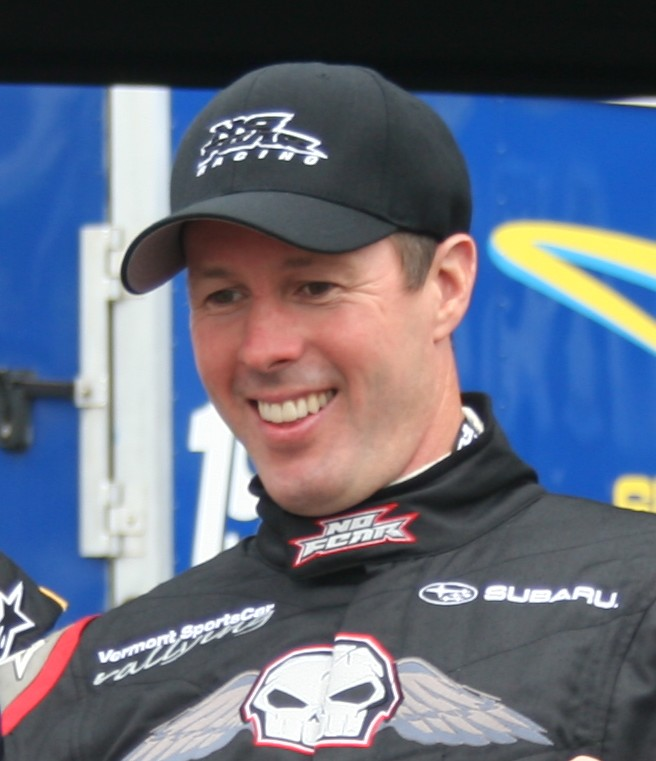
Colin McRae

- 1 September – Abraham Goldberg, doctor (born 1923)
- 3 September
  - Lord Michael Pratt, author (born 1946)
  - Jane Tomlinson, athlete and cancer activist (born 1960)
- 4 September – John Scott, 9th Duke of Buccleuch, peer and politician (born 1923)
- 6 September
  - Eva Crane, beekeeper (born 1916)
  - Jack Hawkes, botanist (born 1915)
  - Ronald Magill, actor (born 1920)
- 8 September – Nicholas Bethell, 4th Baron Bethell, peer, historian of Eastern and Central Europe and human rights campaigner (born 1938)
- 9 September
  - Sir John Anderson, army officer (born 1916)
  - Ian Campbell, Labour politician (born 1926)
  - Sir Tasker Watkins, major-general, jurist and businessman, Lord Justice of Appeal and President of the WRU (1993–2004) (born 1918)
- 10 September
  - James Leasor, author (born 1923)
  - Anita Roddick, environmentalist, political campaigner, businesswoman (The Body Shop) (born 1942)
- 11 September – Ian Porterfield, footballer and football manager (born 1946)
- 13 September – Bill Griffiths, poet (born 1948)
- 15 September
  - Colin McRae, rally driver (born 1968); helicopter accident
  - Sir Jeremy Moore, major-general, commander of the land forces in the Falklands War (born 1928)
- 17 September – Stephen Medcalf, academic (born 1936)
- 19 September – Mike Osborne, jazz musician (born 1941)
- 20 September – Sir Edward Tomkins, diplomat (born 1915)
- 21 September – Ian Gilmour, Baron Gilmour of Craigmillar, peer, baronet and politician (born 1926)
- 22 September – Richard Hornby, politician and businessman (born 1922)
- 26 September – Angela Lambert, journalist and writer (born 1940)
- 30 September – Joe Mitty, entrepreneur and co-founder of Oxfam (born 1919)

=== October ===
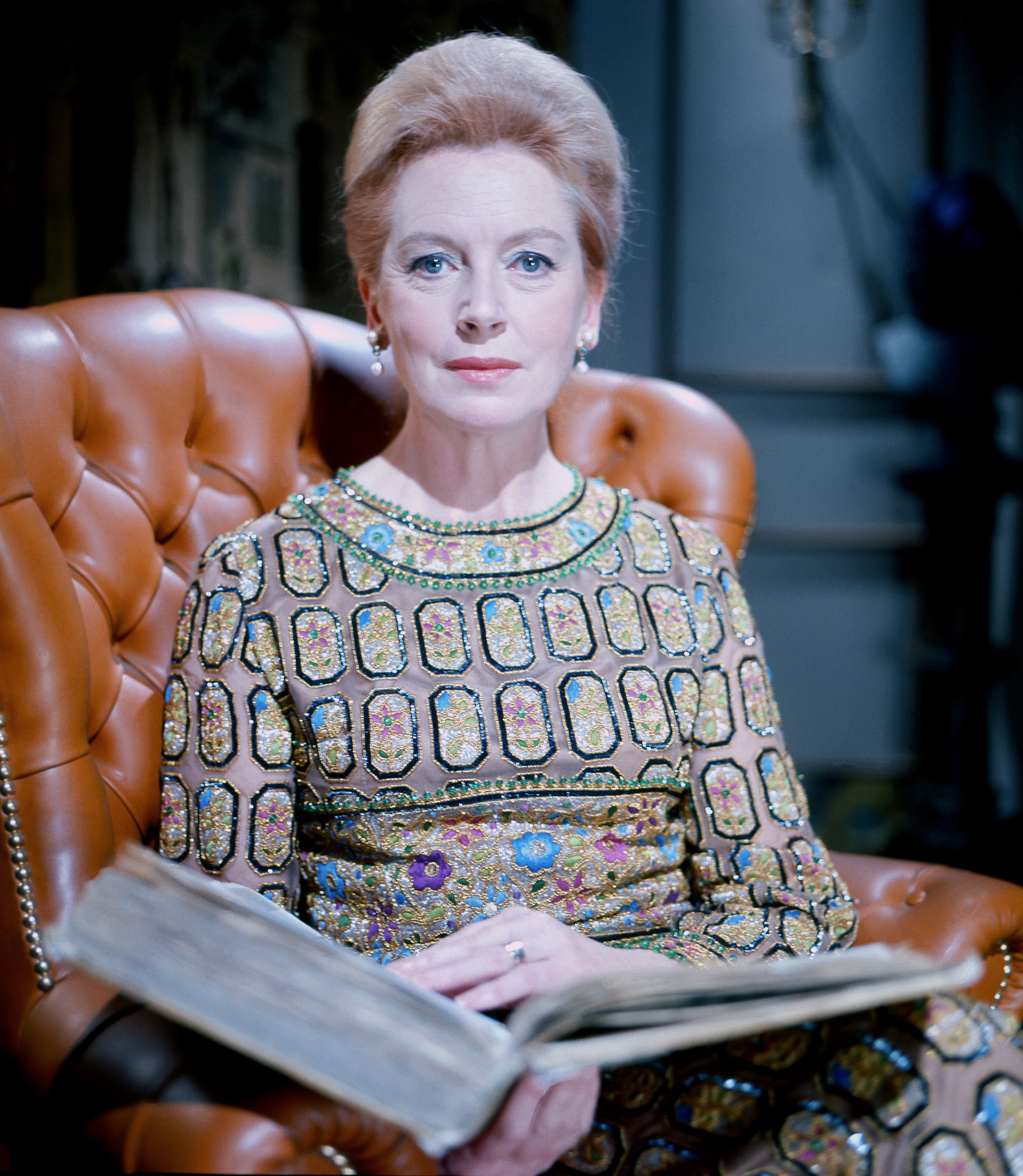
Deborah Kerr

- 1 October
  - Bruce Hay, Scottish rugby union player (born 1950)
  - Ronnie Hazlehurst, composer (born 1928)
  - Ned Sherrin, broadcaster and theatre producer (born 1931)
- 2 October – Christopher Derrick, writer (born 1921)
- 3 October – Sir Richard Trant, Army general in the Falklands War (born 1928)
- 6 October
  - Rodney Diak, actor (born 1924)
  - Terence Wilmot Hutchison, economist (born 1912)
- 7 October – Sir Alan Campbell, diplomat (born 1919)
- 8 October – Nicky James, singer-songwriter (The Moody Blues) (born 1943)
- 9 October – Dudley Ryder, 7th Earl of Harrowby, peer and banker (born 1922)
- 11 October – John H. Edwards, geneticist (born 1928)
- 12 October – Noel Coleman, actor (born 1919)
- 14 October – George Neil Jenkins, scientist (born 1914)
- 16 October
  - Deborah Kerr, actress (born 1921)
  - Barbara West, 2nd to last living survivor of the Titanic sinking (born 1911)
- 18 October
  - Alan Coren, columnist (born 1938)
  - Mark Tavener, novelist and humorist (born 1954)
- 20 October – Paul Raven, rock bassist (Killing Joke) (born 1961)
- 21 October
  - Paul Fox, guitarist (The Ruts) (born 1951)
  - Peter Moffatt, television director (born 1922)
- 23 October
  - David George Kendall, mathematician (born 1918)
  - Ursula Vaughan Williams, writer and wife of composer Ralph Vaughan Williams (born 1911, Malta)
- 24 October – Peter Harding, rock climber (born 1924)
- 25 October – Richard Rougier, judge (born 1932)
- 27 October – Leslie Orgel, chemist (born 1927)
- 28 October – Graham Chadwick, bishop and anti-apartheid campaigner (born 1923)
- 29 October – David Morris, actor (born 1924)
- 30 October – Dina Rabinovitch, journalist (born 1962 in the United States)

=== November ===
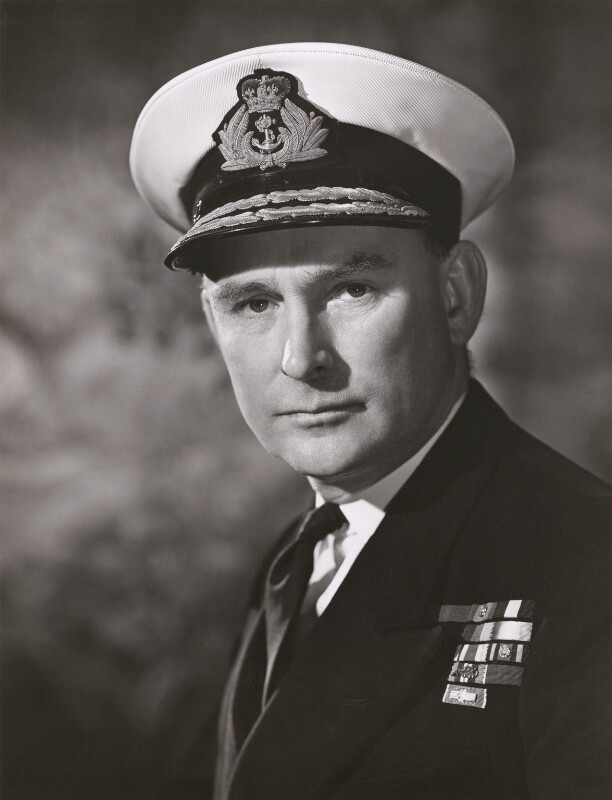
Vice-Admiral Sir Arthur Hezlet

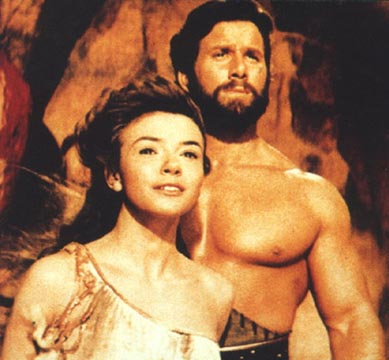
Reg Park (right)

- 2 November
  - Lord Michael Fitzalan-Howard, soldier and courtier, Marshal of the Diplomatic Corps (1972–1981) (born 1917)
  - Reay Tannahill, author (born 1929)
- 6 November – Hilda Braid, actress (born 1929)
- 7 November – Sir Arthur Hezlet, Royal Navy Vice-Admiral and historian (born 1914)
- 8 November
  - David G. P. Taylor, businessman and public official (born 1933)
  - Chad Varah, Anglican priest, founder of the Samaritans (born 1911)
- 9 November – Trish Williamson, television presenter (born 1955); car accident
- 10 November – Sir John Wilfred Stanier, Army field marshal (born 1925)
- 13 November
  - John Doherty, English footballer and manager (born 1935)
  - Sir John Loveridge, Conservative politician (born 1925)
- 16 November – Arthur Watts, lawyer (born 1931)
- 17 November – Vernon Scannell, poet (born 1922)
- 18 November
  - Peter Cadogan, writer and political activist (born 1921)
  - Joe Shaw, English footballer (Sheffield United) (born 1928)
- 19 November
  - Peter Haining, author (born 1940)
  - John Straffen, convicted serial killer (born 1930)
- 20 November – Nigel Bridge, Baron Bridge of Harwich, judge (born 1917)
- 22 November
  - Verity Lambert, television producer (born 1935)
  - Reg Park, bodybuilder and actor (born 1928)
- 23 November – William Tallon, courtier to the royal family (born 1935)
- 25 November
  - Lola Almudevar, journalist (born 1978); car accident in Bolivia
  - Arthur Dimmock, author and historian (born 1918)
- 26 November
  - Marit Allen, film costume designer (born 1941)
  - Susan Williams-Ellis, pottery designer (born 1918)
- 27 November – Philip Allen, Baron Allen of Abbeydale, civil servant (born 1912)
- 28 November – Tony Holland, television producer and writer (born 1940)
- 30 November – J. L. Ackrill, philosopher (born 1921)

=== December ===
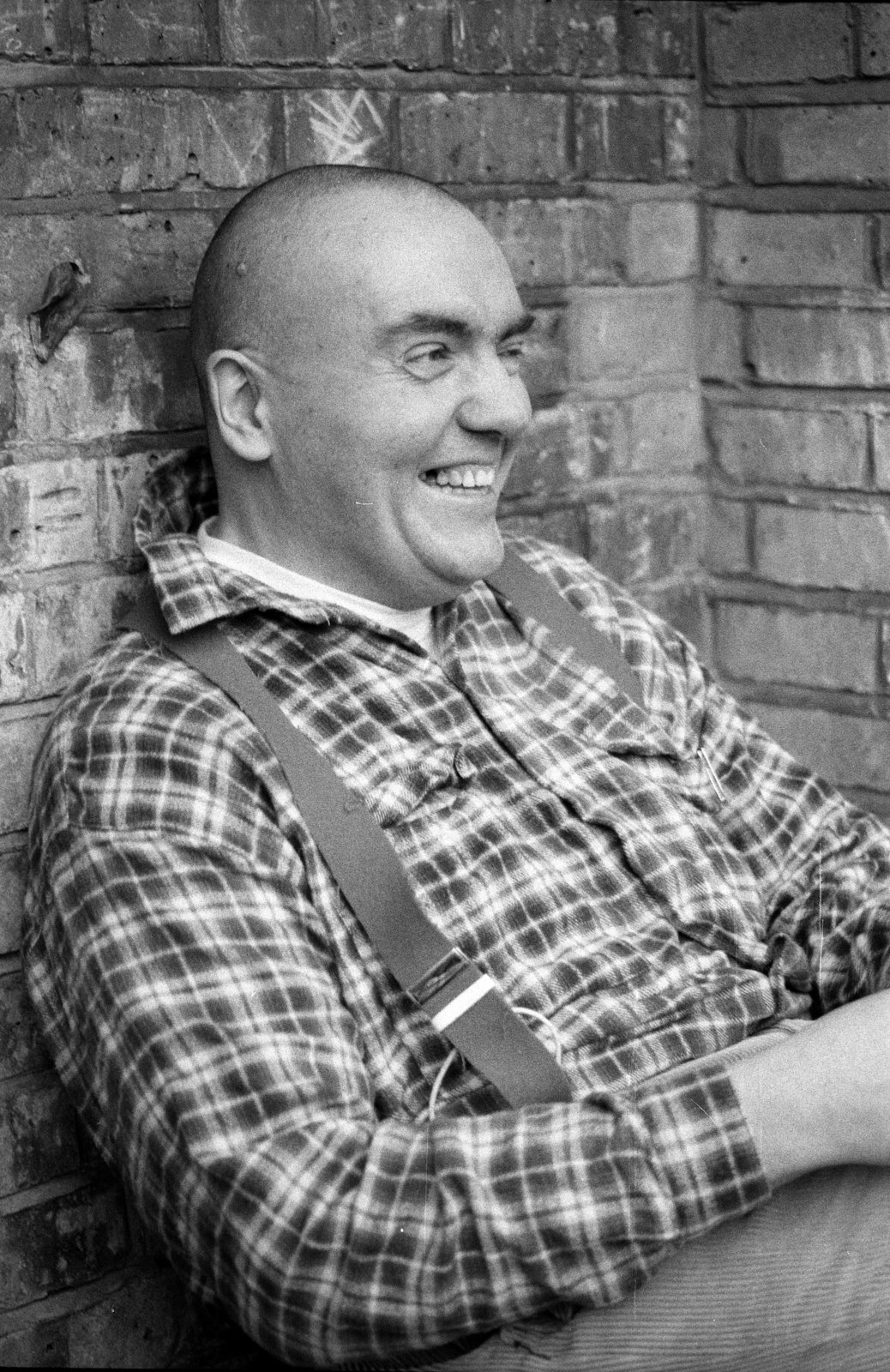
Edward Dutkiewicz

- 1 December
  - Tony Fall, rally driver (born 1940)
  - Anton Rodgers, actor (born 1933)
- 2 December
  - David Maybury-Lewis, anthropologist (born 1929)
  - Les Shannon, footballer and football manager (born 1926)
- 4 December – Stanley McArdle, Navy rear-admiral (born 1922)
- 5 December
  - Christine Finn, actress (born 1929)
  - Tony Tenser, film producer (born 1920)
- 6 December
  - John Hill, politician (born 1912)
  - John Pilkington Hudson, horticulturalist and bomb disposal expert (born 1910)
  - Shelley Rohde, journalist and author (born 1933)
- 8 December – Donald Burton, actor (born 1934)
- 9 December – Edward Dutkiewicz, artist (born 1961)
- 15 December – Gerard Fairtlough, author (born 1930)
- 20 December
  - Arabella Churchill, founder of Children's World charity, granddaughter of Sir Winston Churchill (born 1949)
  - John Gibbs, Anglican prelate, Bishop of Coventry (1976–1985) (born 1917)
  - Geoffrey Martin, historian, Keeper of Public Records (1982–1988) (born 1928)
- 22 December – Andrew Glyn, economist (born 1943)
- 24 December – Sir Nicholas Pumfrey, judge (born 1951)
- 25 December
  - Pat Kirkwood, actress (born 1921)
  - Hugh Massingberd, journalist and genealogist (born 1946)
- 26 December – Andrew Grima, jewellery designer (born 1921)
- 27 December – Howard Colvin, architectural historian (born 1919)
- 29 December
  - Kevin Greening, radio presenter (born 1962)
  - Joan Ingpen, opera talent manager (born 1916)
  - Phil O'Donnell, footballer (born 1972); died while playing
- 30 December – Doreen Norton, nursing pioneer (born 1922)

== See also ==
- 2007 in British music
- 2007 in British television
- List of British films of 2007
- 2007 in England
