= Alan Brooke Pemberton =

British Army officer and intelligence executive

Alan Brooke Pemberton CVO MBE (11 September 1923 – 1 April 2010) was a British Army officer and intelligence executive. In his latter role, he allegedly controlled a covert entity named Diversified Corporate Services Ltd (DCS), and founded a covert intelligence network, which operated under the sponsorship of MI6 and MI5 between the late 1960s and late 1980s.

== Early life and military career ==
Alan Pemberton was born in Peshawar, British India (now Pakistan), to Eric Harry Pemberton and Phyllis Edith Brooke-Alder. He was commissioned into the 2nd Battalion, Coldstream Guards. He served with distinction during the Second World War, in North Africa, Italy (including the Battle of Monte Ornito in 1944, where he was severely wounded), and later in North West Europe during the Allied advance into Germany. After the war, he served in British-controlled Palestine (1946–1947) and during the Malayan Emergency (1948–1953), he was Aide-de-Camp to General Sir Gerald Templer. From 1956 to 1963, Pemberton held various postings in the Caribbean, notably in the Bahamas, Jamaica and British Guiana.

In the 1961 New Year Honours, he was appointed a Member of the British Empire (MBE). He was a member of the Queen's Bodyguard of the Yeoman of the Guard, holding the position of Clerk of the Cheque and Adjutant in 1984.

== Intelligence career ==
After retiring from the military in 1967, Pemberton began working with British Intelligence from 1968 until the 1980s.

According to New Statesman journalist Duncan Campbell Pemberton served in MI6 and MI5, and was involved in collaborations with the CIA and other states' agencies. He controlled and owned the majority of the shares in a covert entity named Diversified Corporate Services Ltd (DCS), which acted as a private intelligence contractor and front for British operations abroad. The role of DCS was controversial and high risk. According to Campbell, Pemberton assembled a group of elite operatives and former army officers, including Major-General Sir John Anderson, who worked through the outsourced company. DCS operated globally, training foreign intelligence agencies and conducting unorthodox operations unsuitable for official involvement. Operational reports were reportedly passed to MI5 and MI6.

On 11 June 1988, Pemberton was appointed as a Commander of the Royal Victorian Order (CVO).
