= Navitaire Inc v Easyjet Airline Co. and BulletProof Technologies, Inc. =

Decision of the High Court of Justice (England and Wales)

Navitaire Inc v Easyjet Airline Co & Another
- Court: High Court of Justice's Chancery Division
- Full case name: Navitaire Inc v Easyjet Airline Co. and BulletProof Technologies Inc.
- Decided: July 30, 2004
- Citation: [2005] ECDR 17; [2005] ECC 30; [2006] RPC 3; [2005] Info TLR 1; [2004] EWHC 1725 (Ch)

Holding
- There was artistic copyright infringement regarding the GUI and Icons of Navitaire's system. Protection was not extended to Single Word commands, Complex Commands, the Collection of Commands as a Whole, or to the VT100screen displays. Navitaire's literary work copyright claim grounded in the "business logic" of the program was rejected as it would unjustifiably extend copyright protection, thereby allowing one to circumvent Directive No. 96/9/EC. This case affirms that copyright protection only governs the expression of ideas and not the idea itself.

Court membership
- Judge sitting: Nicholas Pumfrey

Navitaire Inc v Easyjet Airline Co. and BulletProof Technologies, Inc., is a decision by the England and Wales High Court of Justice (Chancery Division). The case involved a copyright infringement claim brought by Navitaire Inc. ("Navitaire") against EasyJet Airline Company ("EasyJet") and Bulletproof Technologies, Inc. ("Bulletproof") with regards to software used to construct an airline booking (ticket reservation) system. Curiously, it was not claimed that Defendant had access to the original source code or that Defendant's source code resembled Plaintiff's in any way.

The case affirms that it is only the source code or object code of a program - i.e. the underlying framework - that may be protected by copyright. The programming language used to create the program, as well as the program's functional aspects and interfaces, are not to be protected. This is because computer programs are unique as one can achieve a similar result through different means. However, artistic aspects may be protected. That is, copyright subsists in visual images created as icons or graphical user interfaces (GUIs) and the Directive on the Legal Protection of Computer Programs will not apply to these images. Specific to this case, it was held that writing original source code that results in a similar or an identical function to another program does not result in infringement of that program.

Navitaire also confirmed the notion that an injunction would be granted only where it wasn't oppressive.

The Navitaire Court's approach has been confirmed in other opinions. In the Court of Appeals' 2007 decision of "Nova Productions Limited vs. Mazooma Games Limited", the court held that under a program did not infringe on another where it produces similar results but has different underlying source code.

== Attorneys ==
Henry Carr QC, Mark Vanhegan and Anna Edwards-Stuart (instructed by Field Fisher Waterhouse) for the Claimants

Richard Arnold QC and Brian Nicholson (instructed by Herbert Smith) for the Defendants

== The Parties ==
Claimant: Navitaire Inc. ("Navitaire") developed a system called "OpenRes," which is a ticketless airline booking application used by a number of airlines. Users do not receive a ticket, but are given a single reference number to check-in at the airport with. Navitaire owns the copyright in various works that make up the source code of the OpenRes software. OpenRes is predominantly coded in COBOL.

Navitaire's predecessors were Open Skies, Inc. and the Open Skies Division of Hewlett Packard. Open Skies coded and developed the web interface for OpenRes, called "TakeFlight". The court refers to Navitaire and Open Skies, Inc. collectively as Navitaire. The "TakeFlight" module consists only of source code.

- Defendant 1: EasyJet Airline Co. ("Easyjet") is a well-known low-cost airline. Navitaire's predecessors had granted Easyjet a license for OpenRes.
- Defendant 2: BulletProof Technologies Inc. ("BulletProof") is a software developer located in California, who was hired by EasyJet to code the allegedly infringing system, "eRes".

== Facts ==
Navitaire developed an airline booking system called "OpenRes". Its predecessor (Open Skies) had licensed the software to easyJet. easyJet did not have access to the underlying code, and Navitaire does not suggest that easyJet or BulletProof had access to "OpenRes". However, after studying the functionality of OpenRes, easyJet and Bulletproof developed a system called "eRes" and also a web interface that was substantially indistinguishable from OpenRes. easyJet does not dispute the allegation that it wanted a new system that was substantially indistinguishable from OpenRes' interface. Also, it is not disputed that the underlying code of eRes does not resemble OpenRes' codes at all. easyJet created its program by studying and observing how Navitaire's system worked.

Although the code is different, "eRes" acts upon identical or very similar inputs and produces similar results as "OpenRes". Thus, Navitaire filed an action in copyright law based alleging copyright infringement based on "non-textual copying." Specifically, Navitaire claimed that the similarity of the "business logic" (that is the overall look and feel of the software) and functionality of the software rose to the level of "non-textual copying."

Also, with regards to "TakeFlight" it is known that easyJet copied and modified on several occasions to fix bugs, provide for the display of promotions, etc. and to provide the foreign language interfaces as the code was not internationalized. Navitaire alleges easyJet breached the license and again is alleging "non-textual copying" of the software when easyJet produced a user interface with the same "look and feel" of TakeFlight.

As a general matter, the Court stated that: "To emulate the action of a piece of software by the writing of other software that has no internal similarity to the first but is deliberately designed to 'look' the same and achieve the same results is far from uncommon. If Navitaire are right in their most far-reaching submission, much of such work may amount to the infringement of copyright in the original computer program, even if the alleged infringer had no access to the source code for it and did not investigate or decompile the executable program."

=== Non-Textual Copying ===
Non-Textual Copying can be raised when access is not an issue. There are three aspects of non-contextual copying:

1. adoption of the "look and feel" of the software (here, OpenRes)
2. detailed copying of many of the individual commands entered by the user to achieve particular results
3. copying of certain of the results, in the form of screen displays and of 'reports' displayed on the screen in response to prescribed instructions

=== The Interfaces ===
The OpenRes system consists of a database as well as a series of programs that manipulate the data. Each interface consists of single and complex commands that were entered by the user and the relevant display screens.

These different interfaces were:

1. the terminal user interface - what the travel agent interacts with by typing commands; this interface takes the commands an Agent has input, recognizes the commands, and then formats the result of those commands to be displayed on the 'green screen' (aka the terminal user interface)
2. the Fares and Scheduling interface - the appearance of the graphical user interface (GUI) at the database administrator's terminal
3. Internet User Interface or TakeFlight interface- the screens that the user interacts with on the Internet on their personal computer
4. structure of the OpenRes database and the names of objects stored within

=== Navitaire's Allegations ===
With regards to the databases, Navitaire claimed copyright infringement occurred at two points. (1) In transferring or 'migrating' the data contained in OpenRes databases to the new easyRes system. easyJet made interim copies of existing OpenRes databases that they were not granted permission to do. (2) easyJet and BulletProof used their knowledge of the OpenRes databases to design eRes databases such that they infringed copyright of the structure of the program. The court did not find infringement since the databases are not manipulated in the same way as OpenRes.

Navitaire alleged eRes violated copyright when they replicated the overall "look and feel" of the software (i.e. "business logic"); relied on and required identical or similar commands to be entered by an operator as in the OpenRes system; copying the icons displayed in the GUI; and copying the text-based screen displays as well as other results produced by the software.

==== Four Classes of Relevant Copyright Works ====
There were four classes of relevant copyright works that were identified:

1. literary works: comprising the title, form, and nature of each of the literary codes represented by the user command codes
2. complex commands - literary codes were divided into simple commands and complex commands, with complex commands allowing varying arguments. Dr. Hunt described these as being ones "where the user enters a mixture of command characters and data and has a number of sub-options or choices."
3. all OpenRes user command codes ("compilation") - this was an alternate legal basis to allege that eRes commands are identical to or similar to OpenRes commands
4. the layouts of particular screens of the terminal user interface

==== Summary of Allegations ====
In summary, the issues are as follows. Navitaire contend that copyright subsists in the command set as a copyright work distinct from the source code. This claim has a number of aspects: (i) the collection of commands as a whole is entitled to copyright as a 'compilation'; (ii) each of the commands is a copyright work in its own right; (iii) alternatively, each of the 'complex' commands is a work in its own right. As to the displays, Navitaire contend that (i) in respect of the VT100 screen displays, the 'template' (fixed data and layout of variable data) is a separate copyright work for each display and (ii) certain GUI screens on the separate Schedule Maintenance module are copyright works as they stand and have been copied. Then it is said (and this is a quite distinct allegation) that the similarity exhibited by eRes to OpenRes in the eye of the user is such that there has been 'non-textual copying' of the whole of the source code. This is said to be strictly analogous to taking the plot of a book[12]: an author who takes the plot of another work and copies nothing else will still infringe copyright if a substantial part of the earlier author's work is represented by that plot, and the same goes for computer programs: John Richardson Computers v Flanders [1993] FSR 497 (Ferris J).

=== easyJet's Position ===
easyJet accepts that copyright subsists in the source code of OpenRes. However, they stressed to the court that with regards to the user interface, the only question to be considered was whether a substantial part was taken since none of the code was directly copied. eRes only used some of the command names, which is not a substantial part of the source code. They did not agree that copyright subsists in a command set either as individual commands or as a compilation, since these were not works to begin with. Moreover, the graphical displays were also not works. So, they contended that "non-contextual copying" would extend protection in copyright to matters that cannot legitimately be covered by copyright. That is, it was argued that the claim went to the "functional idea of the program, rather than to the expression of that idea in software."

== Issue(s) ==
1. Does replication of the "look and feel" of a computer program - using similar inputs and that produces similar outputs - count as "non-textual" copying of a computer program? That is, can the "business logic" of a program be protected?
2. Does copyright subsist in single word commands, complex commands, or the collection of commands as a whole? If yes, which ones?
3. Does copyright subsist in graphical screen displays and icons? If so, which ones?

== Holding ==
(1) NO - When it comes to computer programs, copyright law does not protect against "non-textual" copying.

As long as the underlying source code is different, there is no problem if the ultimate Look and Feel are similar. In the present case, the fact easyJet didn't have access aided the court in finding no infringement. Moreover, the court took into account that the peculiar aspect of computer programs is that there are several different ways of producing a similar or identical result. So, the "business logic" (i.e. functionality) of a program can not be protected by copyright law. Finding otherwise, would extend copyright unjustifiably.

Based on Navitaire, merely copying the look and feel of a program or website does not rise to the level of infringement of copyright. That is, using underlying ideas and principles, without copying the actual expression (source code) does not infringe on another even if the functionality is the same. However, the appearance may be argued as infringing on an artistic work (see details below).

The Metaphor:

Navitaire urged that easyJet's studying the OpenRes system's functionality resulted in taking a substantial part of the source code, was similar to reading a novel, taking the plot, and using that same plot in a new novel. However, the court disagreed with this reasoning and found that computer programs and code were not like a novel. Instead, the court found that the case was more like a chef who invents pudding using a different recipe than original, but derives a similar result. That is, one chef after several tries comes up with a tasty pudding dish and writes down the recipe. Another chef then tries it and decides to recreate it, but comes up with his own recipe. This would not be considered infringement as although the results were the same, the means to derive them were different.

(2) NO - Single words, complex commands, and compilation of commands do not qualify as literary works.

Single word commands do not qualify as literary works and do not have the necessary qualities of a literary work. Based on the 1988 Act, the test to be considered is "merely whether a written artefact is to be accorded the status of a copyright work having regard to the kind of skill and labour expended, the nature of copyright protection and its underlying policy."

Complex commands (i.e. commands that have a syntax or have one or more arguments that must be expressed in a particular way) also do not qualify. The 1988 Act mandates that a literary work be written or recorded. Moreover, Recitals 13-15 of the Software Directive reinforce that computer languages may not be copyrighted. In the present case, these was no identifiable "literary work" that embodied command codes. Similarly, collections of commands count as a language and can not be protected as a compilation. Protection of a computer program may not be extended to functionality alone.

"Copyright protection for computer software is a given, but I do not feel that the courts should be astute to extend that protection into a region where only the functional effects of a program are in issue. There is a respectable case for saying that copyright is not, in general, concerned with functional effects, and there is some advantage in a bright line rule protecting only the claimant's embodiment of the function in software and not some superset of that software. The case is not truly analogous with the plot of a novel, because the plot is part of the work itself. The user interface is not part of the work itself. One could permute all the letters and other codes in the command names, and it would still work in the same way, and all that would be lost is a modest mnemonic advantage. To approach the problem in this way may at least be consistent with the distinction between idea and expression that finds its way into the Software Directive, but, of course, it draws the line between idea and expression in a particular place which some would say lies too far on the side of expression. I think, however, that such is the independence of the particular form of the actual codes used from the overall functioning of the software that it is legitimate to separate them in this way, and not to afford them separate protection when the underlying software is not even arguably copied."

(3) YES BUT NOT ALL - Only an artistic work can rise to the level of copyright protection.

In the present case, the VT100 screen displays did not rise to this level. They were considered to be tables and found to be literary in character. Based on Article 1(2) of the Directive, these were simply ideas underlying the computer program's interfaces, providing merely "the static framework for the display of the dynamic data which it is the task of the software to produce."

However, the Graphic User Interfaces (GUIs) and icons qualified as artistic works and were given protection. This was due to the skill and labour required to arrange the screens in a certain way. The icons too were copyrighted works. The court found that since the icons used in the GUIs were copyrighted works, and easyJet had made identical copies, easyJet had infringed Navitaire's copyright.

=== Claims with regards to TakeFlight ===
easyJet managed to convince the court that as licensees they were permitted to alter and modify the program to resolve any bugs and make modifications that they were hired to do. However, the court found infringement where database fields were reproduced unnecessarily.

=== Summary of Elements at Issue and the Court's Decision regarding Protection ===
Elements at Issue	Court's Decision
Single Word Commands (e.g. exit)	Not protected
Complex Commands	Not protected - Amount to claim for copyright in a computer language, which is precluded by the Computer Programs Directive
Collection of Commands as a Whole	Not protected - Amount to claim for copyright in a computer language, which is precluded by the Computer Programs Directive
VT100 Screen Displays (displays printable characters)	Not protected - Amount to "ideas which underlie the program's interface"
GUI Screen Displays (for graphics)	Protected - Distinct Artistic Work
Icons	Protected - Distinct Artistic Work
"Business logic" of the Program as a Whole	Not Protected - Would be an unjustifiable extension of copyright protection and would allow for the circumvention of the Directive

== Relevant Law ==
=== Copyright Law and Directive No. 96/9/EC ===
In the US and the UK, a Copyright grants protection for the expression of an idea and not an idea itself. A Database right according to the European Union is a property right. In the EU it is defined by Directive No. 96/9/EC This Directive on the legal protection of databases was passed on 11 March 1996 and affords legal protection to databases granting both specific and separate legal rights and limitations to computer records. These rights are collectively known as database rights.

==== Article 1(2) of the Software Directive ====
See for Full Text. The court analyzed this section as making clear the important dichotomy of copyright law that ideas are not protected, but the expression is. Thus, the code as written is protected, but not the interfaces, function, or programming language.

=== Copyright, Designs and Patents Act 1988 ===
See for Full Text

==== Literary, dramatic and musical works ====
3.—(1) In this Part— "literary work' means any work, other than a dramatic or musical work, which is written, spoken or sung, and accordingly includes— (a) a table or compilation other than a database, (b) a computer program, (c) preparatory design material for a computer program and (d) a database; … (2) Copyright does not subsist in a literary, dramatic or musical work unless and until it is recorded, in writing or otherwise; and references in this Part to the time at which such a work is made are to the time at which it is so recorded.

==== Provision Added by reg 15 of the Copyright and Related Rights Regulations 2003 ====
50BA.—(1) It is not an infringement of copyright for a lawful user of a computer program to observe, study or test the functioning of the program in order to determine the ideas and principles which underlie any element of the program if he does so while performing any of the acts of loading, displaying, running, transmitting or storing the program which he is entitled to do.

(2) Where an act is permitted under this section, it is irrelevant whether or not there exists any term or condition in an agreement which purports to prohibit or restrict the act (such terms being, by virtue of section 296A, void).

== See also ==
Intellectual Property
