= Stephen Medcalf (academic) =

Stephen Ellis Medcalf (15 November 1936 – 17 September 2007) was a reader in English in the School of European Studies, University of Sussex, from its inception in 1963 to retirement in 2005. An academic and scholar of classics and European literature, he once alerted authorities to an abandoned newborn baby in a telephone box. Medcalf was a student of Iris Murdoch, friend of Anthony Nuttall, colleague of Gabriel Josipovici and teacher of novelist Ian McEwan. Obituaries appeared in The Guardian, The Independent, The Telegraph, The Times, and Church Times.

== Biography ==
Stephen Medcalf was born on 15 November 1936 in Romford, Essex, the youngest of four children. His father was an English and French master at Hackney Downs School who had taught Harold Pinter. Evacuated to Bury St Edmonds during the Second World War, Medcalf was later educated at Chigwell School before going to Merton College, Oxford to study classics. Early in his time at Oxford he met Tony Nuttall who was to become a lifelong friend, and the pair changed their studies to English Literature and were tutored by Hugo Dyson and taught by Iris Murdoch among others.

After graduating with a BLitt, Medcalf spent a year teaching at Malvern School before joining Tony Nuttall at the newly founded University of Sussex. Taking up his post as an assistant lecturer in the School of European Studies, Medcalf thrived in the multi-disciplinary approach fostered by David Daiches, Asa Briggs and Martin Wight. Rising to the position of reader in English, Medcalf taught both arts and science students as well as reviewing and writing about authors such as G.K. Chesterton, P.G. Wodehouse, Evelyn Waugh, C.S. Lewis, Owen Barfield, Charles Williams (British writer) and William Golding, composing long articles for The Times Literary Supplement, as well as taking a holistic interest in the later middle ages, that culminated in The Later Middle Ages (1981) a collaboration between historians and art historians together with essays of his own. Medcalf's memory and his intellect were admired by his colleagues and friends, Gabriel Josipovici wrote:

Not only could he recite reams of poetry in Greek, Latin, English and Anglo-Saxon, and whole stories by Kipling and PG Wodehouse, but - and this is what really marked him out - whatever he said about literature immediately struck one as true, fresh and profound. I can hardly recall an occasion when I left his company without feeling that I had seen something I had previously overlooked, and that life and the world were the better for it.

Medcalf never became a professor, perhaps due to his limited written output and that his magnum opus, a study of the development of T.S. Eliot's mind, was never completed. In Medcalf's early years at Sussex University his students included Ian McEwan, who spurred Medcalf in later life to write a Guardian Christmas story in 2003. The true story, described as a "modern fairy tale" tells how Medcalf had found in a Lewes telephone box, a newborn baby girl crying inside a paper bag. The story ends with a "epiphanic" meeting in a Lewes restaurant between Medcalf and the girl, now grown up.

Medcalf spent forty years at the University of Sussex and retired in 2002. He remained a bachelor and was a devoted Christian and lay preacher who frequently spent time in religious retreat, and organised a popular annual University Christmas Carol service. Medcalf died at Littlehampton, West Sussex on 17 September 2007.

== Selected works ==
- William Golding (Writers & Their Work S.) (1975)
- The Later Middle Ages (1981)
- Poems for All Purposes: Selected Poems of G.K. Chesterton (1994)
- A Light in the Darkness (2003)
- The Spirit of England - Selected Essays of Stephen Medcalf (2010) (posthumously published collection)
