= Robert Fraser (writer) =

British author and biographer

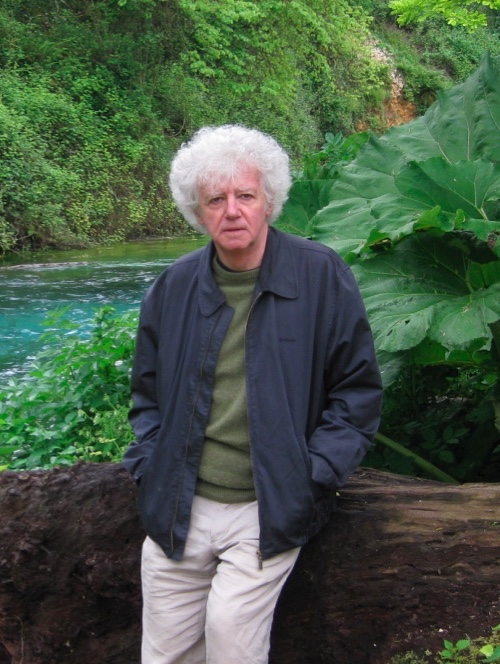
Robert Fraser at the Syri i Kaltër ("Blue Eye") spring in Albania, May 2016. Photo by Maria Thanasi.

Robert Fraser FRSL (born 10 May 1947) is a British author and biographer.

== Early life ==
Fraser was born on 10 May 1947 in Surbiton, Surrey, the second son of Harry MacKenzie Fraser, a London solicitor, and Ada Alice Gittins of Pontypool in the county of Monmouthshire. His brother was Malcolm Fraser (1939–2012), Emeritus Professor of Opera at the University of Cincinnati and co-founder of the Buxton Festival. At the age of eight, Robert Fraser won a choral scholarship to Winchester Cathedral, where he sang the daily services while studying at the Pilgrims School in the Close. Among his fellow choristers were the future newscaster Jon Snow and international tenor Julian Pike. After attending Kingston Grammar School. Fraser went on to the University of Sussex to read English with David Daiches and Anthony Nuttall. He later wrote a doctorate on tradition in English poetry at Royal Holloway, University of London, where the college's famous gallery of Victorian paintings was to inspire his illustrated volume of poetry The Founders' Gift: Impressions from a Collection (2017). Simultaneously with his doctorate he studied Harmony, Counterpoint and Composition at Morley College with Melanie Daiken and James Iliff.

== Teaching ==
Fraser began his teaching career at the University of Cape Coast in Ghana, where he lectured from 1970 to 1974 before moving to the University of Leeds to teach under Geoffrey Hill. He subsequently held posts in the University of London and at Trinity College, Cambridge, where he was Director of Studies in English until 1993, tutoring among others the novelist Belinda Starling and the actor Alexander Armstrong.

Fraser is currently Emeritus Professor of English at the Open University and a Fellow of the Royal Society of Literature.

== Writing ==
Fraser's choral background can be detected in his work for the stage, such as the performing translation of Domenico Cimarosa's opera Il pittor parigino performed at Buxton in 1989. He has also published articles on the cultural and political contexts of the music of Purcell and Handel His comparative essays on literature and music are collected in Literature, Music and Cosmopolitanism: Culture as Migration (2018). He is the author of several biographical works for the theatre, including plays on the lives of the composer Carlo Gesualdo and of Byron. God's Good Englishman, his dramatic portrait of Samuel Johnson, opened at the Oxford Playhouse in 1984 and toured Britain with the actor Timothy West in its title role.

=== Marcel Proust and Sir James Frazer ===
Academically, Fraser is both a Proust scholar and a specialist in the writing of his near namesake, the classicist and cultural anthropologist James George Frazer, on whom he has published several books, and the genesis of whose best known work on magic, religion and myth he charted in The Making of The Golden Bough: The Origins and Growth of An Argument. A study in intellectual gestation, it was later integrated into the full "archive" edition of Frazer's magnum opus as a special introductory volume. In 1994 he edited for the Oxford World's Classics a "new abridgement" of Frazer's classic that brought some of its most provocative ideas back into general circulation, including theories on Christianity and sacred prostitution.

At the same time, he is a critic of the work of writer Marcel Proust, on whom he has published a cited study, and spoken about on BBC Radio 4's In Our Time.

=== Biography and poetry ===
In the wider literary world, Fraser is principally associated with the life and work of certain twentieth-century British poets. In the early 1980s he conducted a dispute with Laura Riding, former consort of Robert Graves, who took issue with his review of her Collected Poems.

In 1987, he edited the Collected Poems, and in 1995 the Selected Poems, of T. S. Eliot's protégé George Barker. His life of Barker, The Chameleon Poet, aroused opposition among some members of the poet's own family. However, on its appearance in late 2001, it was warmly reviewed by the poets laureate Carol Ann Duffy and Andrew Motion, and by the writers Anthony Thwaite, Vernon Scannell, Humphrey Carpenter and Frederic Raphael; it was chosen by the novelist D. J. Taylor as Spectator Book of the Year for 2002.

In 2012, Fraser's biography of the poet David Gascoyne, Barker's lifelong friend, was published by the Oxford University Press. The book was criticised in some quarters for devoting insufficient space to the darker side of Gascoyne's personality. "Fatally," remarked Paul Batchelor in The Times Literary Supplement, "Fraser has little time for introverts". In marked contrast, reviewing the book for The Guardian, Iain Sinclair lauded it as "a witnessed romance of manners and slights, a landscape in which cold biographical facts are converted into metaphors of questing vision, delirium, breakdown". In May the book was placed first in the Independent's chart of 10 best new biographies. Fraser's own poetry is collected in Fox Hill in The Snow and other poems (2016).

=== Literature in the World ===
Fraser was one of the guiding spirits behind Heinemann Educational Book's celebrated African Writers Series, and is a founding editor of the 35-year-old journal Wasafiri. He has published a "critical history" of West African poetry, along with monographs on Ben Okri– a personal friend – and the Ghanaian novelist Ayi Kwei Armah. During 2004–07, he travelled in India and Africa researching a comparative account of publishing in those regions which appeared in 2008 as Book History Through Postcolonial Eyes: Re-Writing the Script.The Cambridge Companion to the History of the Book described this as "a highly nuanced, densely argued comparative study of the technologies of the intellect – speech, gesture and print – as they manifest themselves in South Asia and sub-Saharan Africa", and concluded: "In an exposé of the necessary rapprochement between book history and postcolonialism Fraser counters the evolutionary telos of western print capitalism, challenges alphabetical literacy as the universal litmus test registering the impact of writing systems and print technologies, and disputes an indifferentiated approach to the history of the non-western book. He argues that communicative forms are multivalent, mutually constitutive, opportunistic and deeply implicated in their resistance to, or adaptation of, local cultural expressions." Over the same period, Fraser co-edited with his friend Professor Mary Hammond of Southampton University a two-volume survey of international publishing entitled Books Without Borders. In October 2005, in connection with this work, he was elected a Fellow of the Royal Asiatic Society.

=== Style ===
Fraser has been described as a writer "who tries to keep one foot planted in, and the other well outside, academe". Yale's Harold Bloom has noted his powers of comparative analysis, and Harvard's Biodun Jeyifo has commended the "superb work" of "this meticulous scholar-critic". The classicist Roger Just has also drawn attention to his "care, precision, good sense and...admirable lightness of touch.". However, his writing has also given rise to vocal dissent, adopting as he does a line that seems now radical, now trenchantly traditionalist. His decision, in the words of John McLeod, "not to work with the niceties and orthodoxies of postcolonial theory" has on occasions given rise to sharply worded rejoinders. He has little time for critical fashion and in 1999 coined the mocking term "Theocolonialism" to describe the subordination of independent judgement to passing fad, and the purported tendency among some academics in the field of literary studies to leap aboard noisy bandwagons.

== Personal life ==
For 32 years, until her death in 2014, Fraser was married to the law lecturer Catherine Birkett. In 2018, he published Pascal's Tears: How Not to Murder One's Wife, a 270-page "opened letter" narrating the circumstances of her death, and meditating on the ethical, legal and religious implications of her treatment. Their son is the theoretical physicist Dr Benedict Joseph ("Benjo") Fraser. Robert Fraser is now married to the biographer and food historian Dr Brigid Allen.

== Books and performances ==
=== Books ===
- Tartini's Rest: Tales Two Brothers Told (Cambridge: Cranthorpe Milner, 2025), x + 256 pp. - ISBN 978-1-80378-291-1; eBook: ISBN 978-1-80378-303-1
- The Quality of the Light: A Novel in Five Paintings (Cambridge: Cranthorpe Milner, 2021), vii + 422 pp. - ISBN 978-1-912964-75-8. eBook: ISBN 978-1-912964-76-5
- After Ancient Biography: Modern Types and Classical Archetypes (London: Palgrave Macmillan, 2020), xvii + 273 pp. - ISBN 978-3-030-35168-7; paperback: ISBN 978-3-030-35171-7; eBook: ISBN 978-3-030-35169-4.
- Literature, Music and Cosmopolitanism: Culture as Migration (London: Palgrave Macmillan, 2018), xii + 212 pp. - ISBN 978-3-319-68479-6; paperback: ISBN 978-3-319-88610-7; eBook: ISBN 978-3-319-68480-2.
- Pascals's Tears: Or How Not to Murder One's Wife (London: Cranthorpe Milner, 2018), xiv +298pp. - ISBN 978-1-9164400-1-2; eBook: ISBN 978-1-9164400-5-0.
- Sir James George Frazer, The Golden Bough: A Study in Magic and Religion Edited with an Introduction and Notes by Robert Fraser, 2 volumes. Illustrated by Romy Blümel (London: The Folio Society, 2018.) Vol. One: lvi + 408pp. Vol. Two: xii + 506pp.
- The Founders' Gift: Impressions from A Collection (London: Royal Holloway College, 2017), 68 pp. - ISBN 978-1-905846-80-1.
- Fox Hill in the Snow and other poems (London: Balmond and Mackenzie, 2016), 98pp. -ISBN 978-0-946441-02-0.
- Night Thoughts: The Surreal Life of the Poet David Gascoyne (Oxford: Oxford University Press, 2012), xx + 470 pp. - ISBN 978-0-19-955814-8.
- Sir James George Frazer, La Rama Dorada, Magia y religión, Nuevo compendio a partir de la secunda y tercera ediciónes, Edición, Introducción y notas Robert Fraser (Mexico: Fondo de Cultura Económica, 2011), L + 644 pp. - ISBN 978-607-16-0646-4.
- Book History Through Postcolonial Eyes: Re-writing the Script (London: Routledge, 2008). xiv + 210 pp. - ISBN 978-0-415-40293-4; paperback; ISBN 978-0-415-40294-1; eBook: ISBN 978-0-203-88811-7.
- Books Without Borders edited with Mary Hammond, two volumes (London: Palgrave Macmillan, 2008) Vol. One: The Cross-National Dimension in Print Culture, - ISBN 978-0-230-21029-5; Vol. Two: Perspectives from South Asia, - ISBN 978-0-230-21033-2.
- The Book in The World: Readers Writers, Publishers (special issue of Wasafiri 52) co-edited with Susheila Nasta (London: Routledge, Autumn 2007), 100 pp. - ISBN 978-0-415-43157-6.
- Ben Okri: Towards the Invisible City Writers and Their Work (Tavistock: Northcote House, in association with the British Council, 2002), xviii + 116pp. - ISBN 0-7463-0993-7.
- The Chameleon Poet: A Life of George Barker (London: Jonathan Cape; Sydney, Auckland and South Africa: Random House, 2001), xiv + 573pp. ISBN 0-224-06242-5. Paperback (London: Pimlico 2002) - ISBN 0-7126-9171-5.
- The Making of the Golden Bough: The Origins and Growth of an Argument Palgrave Archive Edition, issued as volume two of fifteen-volume Palgrave Archive Reprint of J.G. Frazer, The Golden Bough: A Study in Magic and Religion Third Edition, (London: Macmillan, 1906-15) (Basingstoke: Palgrave, 2001), xiv + 240pp. - ISBN 0-333-98684-9.
- Lifting the Sentence: A Poetics of Postcolonial Fiction (Manchester and New York: Manchester University Press, 2000), x +254pp. - ISBN 0-7190-5370-6; paperback: ISBN 0-7190-5371-4.
- Victorian Quest Romance: Stevenson, Kipling, Haggard, and Conan Doyle Writers and Their Work (Plymouth: Northcote House, in association with the British Council, 1998; Cambridge University Press, 2000), xvi + 96pp. - ISBN 0-7463-0904-X. eBook: ISBN 978-1786-94645-4.
- The Selected Poetry of George Barker Edited by Robert Fraser (London: Faber and Faber; Connecticut: Faber Inc., 1995), xii + 148 pp. - ISBN 0-571-17285-7.
- The Golden Bough: A New Abridgement from the Second and Third Editions Edited with an introduction and notes by Robert Fraser. The World's Classics (Oxford and New York: Oxford University Press, 1994), xlix + 859 pp. - ISBN 978-0-19-282934-4. Re-issued in 1998 as ISBN 978-0-19-283541-3, and in 2009 as ISBN 978-0-19-953882-9.
- Proust and the Victorians: The Lamp of Memory (London: The Macmillan Press; New York: The St Martin's Press, 1994), xii + 320 pp. - ISBN 0-333-58473-2 (UK edition), ISBN 0-312-10364-6 (USA edition).
- Sir James Frazer and the Literary Imagination: Essays in Affinity and Influence Edited by Robert Fraser [other contributors: Gillian Beer; A.S. Byatt; Peter L. Caracciolo; Steven Connor; Robert Crawford; Warwick Gould; Robert Hampson; Christopher Harvie; Lionel Kelly; Philip L. Marcus; David Richards; Diedre Toomey] (Basingstoke: The Macmillan Press; New York: The St Martin's Press, 1990), xviii + 307 pp. - ISBN 0-333-48683-8.
- The Making of the Golden Bough: The Origins and Growth of an Argument (Basingstoke: The Macmillan Press; New York: The St Martin's Press, 1990), xiv + 240pp. - ISBN 0-333-49631-0.
- The Collected Poems of George Barker Edited by Robert Fraser (London: Faber and Faber, Connecticut: Faber Inc., 1987), xi + 838pp. - ISBN 0-571-13972-8.
- West African Poetry: A Critical History (Cambridge, New York and Melbourne: Cambridge University Press, 1986), vii + 351pp. Maps; 20 musical examples. - ISBN 978-0-521-30993-6. paperback: ISBN 978-0-521-31223-3.
- Edward Brathwaite's "Masks": A Critical View (London; Rex Collings for the British Council "Nexus" Series, 1981), 40pp. - ISBN 0-86036-137-3; Second Edition (London: Collins for the British Council "Nexus Series, 1985) vi + 54 pp.
- This Island Place (London: Harrap, 1981), ix + 115 pp. - ISBN 978-0-24553-569-7.
- The Novels of Ayi Kwei Armah: A Study in Polemical Fiction (London: Heinemann Educational Books, 1980), xiii +113 pp. - ISBN 0-435913018.
- Reading African Poetry: An Introduction for Schools (London: Collins, 1975), vi + 96pp. - ISBN 978-0003218664.

=== Theatre works ===
- "Bugger the Skylarks!": Lawrence and Mansfield at War: A Battle in Ten Scenes in Katherine Mansfield Studies Vol 2, No. 1 (Edinburgh University Press, 2010), 100–163. – ISSN: 2041-45.
- "Itene, o miei sospiri": The Agony of Carlo Gesualdo: Workshop production, Lucca Opera Theatre Festival, Lucca, Italy, July, 1997.
- The Parisian Painter [English Acting Version of Il pittor parigino, from the Italian of Giuseppe Petrosellini, music by Domenico Cimarosa], The Buxton Opera Festival, 3-12 August, 1989.
- "Very Naughty O..." ["Pessima O..."] Lord Byron and the Contessa Teresa Guiccioli, (Byron Bicentenary Production), Newark - Clifton - Clipstone - Southwell - Hucknall - Ollerton - Averham - Worksop - Grantham -London, November, 1988- January, 1989.
- "God's Good Englishman": An Investigation into the Life and Opinions of Dr Samuel Johnson (Johnson Bicentenary Production, with Timothy West as Johnson; David Ashton as Boswell; Maureen O'Brien as Mrs Thrale, and Okon Jones as everybody else) The Oxford Playhouse - The Arts Theatre, Cambridge - The Opera House, Belfast - Arundel Castle (for the Duke of Norfolk) - The King's Lynn Festival - The Epsom Playhouse, June - December, 1984.
- A Mistress Not So Coy: A Dialogue for Two Torsos [Andrew Marvell and His Disingenuous Girlfriend], The Swarthmore Centre, Leeds, May, 1978.
- Something in the Air, University of Leeds Workshop Theatre, Lunch time Production, April, 1977.
- January and May: A Chaucerian Carnival (a musical staging of Chaucer's 'The Marchantes Tale'), Swarthmore Centre, Leeds, and tour of Yorkshire colleges of education, May - June, 1976.
- The Last Supper (Acting Version of the Baker's Guild Play from The York Cycle), Street Production, University and City of Leeds, April 1975.
- Gesualdo: The Life and Death of Carlo Gesualdo, Prince of Venosa, A Madrigal Show for Actor-Narrator and Voices, Welsh Theatre Company, Cardiff - Bristol, September - December 1974.
- Soul Brother: A Rock Musical for Actors, Singers and Band with Orville Bell, Uwa Hunwick, Israel Fummey and "Boombaya", British Council Theatre, Accra, April 4-7, 1973.
- Kwame's Aunt [An Africanisation of Charley's Aunt by Brandon Thomas], University Theatre, Cape Coast, Ghana, June 1972.
