= Doreen Norton =

English nurse, innovator (1922–2007)

Doreen Norton OBE, FRCN
- Born: 1922
- Died: 2007 (aged 84–85)
- Occupation: nurse leader

Doreen Norton OBE FRCN (1 May 1922, in Dartford, Kent – 30 December 2007, in Worthing, West Sussex) was an English nurse, in the 1950s she used research to show that the best treatment and prevention of bedsores was removing the pressure by turning the patient. She also helped to design the Kings Fund bed, a new type of hospital bed now widely used. Norton was made a Fellow of the Royal College of Nursing, received an honorary fellowship from the University of the South Bank in London, and a ward in Lewisham University Hospital was named after her.

== Life ==
Norton was born on 1 May 1922 in Dartford in Kent. Her father owned a refrigeration engineering firm, and her mother was a mental nurse. Norton's first job after leaving school at 14 was in her father's firm. For her National Service during the Second World War, Norton chose to train as a nurse at St Charles Hospital in Ladbroke Grove, London. Norton was assigned in her first year to an emergency hospital, and when she protested that she had not been trained for the work, she was assigned instead to an old people's ward. Norton qualified as a nurse in 1946, passing her certificate with distinction. In 1951 she gained her British Tuberculosis Association certificate, also with distinction, and Royal College of Nursing ward sister's certificate.

In 1957 Norton wrote a guide to looking after geriatric patients (Looking After Old People at Home). Working in the Whittington hospital, Norton carried out research into pressure sores. At that time, nurses had many options for treating bed sores, including applying methylated spirits, and massage, but none were effective treatments. Norton showed that the most effective treatment was to relieve the pressure, by turning patients regularly. This research was published in 1962 in the book An Investigation of Geriatric Nursing Problems in Hospital, and was considered seminal. Norton's study helped change nursing practices to effectively treat pressure ulcers, which were at that time a major killer of hospital inpatients. Norton went on to advocate for better geriatric nursing in general, and lectured on the subject in Australia and New Zealand. She helped design the King's Fund bed, an adjustable hospital bed that became widely used.

Norton was appointed as a research fellow at the University of Edinburgh, and earned a Master of Science in 1969, with a thesis on equipment to deal with basic nursing problems. After this she worked as a nursing officer for the Scottish Home and Health Department. In 1959 Norton was one of four founders of the Research Society of the Royal College of Nursing, and was the first chairman of the Society of Geriatric Nursing. In 1982 Norton was appointed Visiting Professor of Gerontological Nursing at Case Western Reserve University, in Ohio.

Norton died on 30 December 2007 in Worthing.

== Awards ==
Norton was made a Fellow of the Royal College of Nursing in 1976, the highest honour the College awards. She was appointed an OBE in 1977. She received an honorary fellowship from the University of the South Bank in London, and a ward in Lewisham University Hospital was named after her (The Doreen Norton Ward).
