= Nicholas Pumfrey =

British barrister and judge (1951–2007)

Sir Nicholas Richard Pumfrey (22 May 1951 – 24 December 2007) styled The Rt Hon. Lord Justice Pumfrey, was a British barrister. He served as a High Court judge for 10 years, and was promoted to the Court of Appeal little more than a month before his sudden death.

== Early life and education ==
The son of Peter and Maureen Pumfrey, Nicholas Pumfrey was brought up in Bristol, where his father was a solicitor. He was educated at St Edward's School, Oxford. In 1969, he matriculated at St Edmund Hall, Oxford, where he received his Bachelor of Arts (BA) in Physics in 1972. He also completed a degree in Law in 1974.

== Career ==
Pumfrey was called to the Bar by the Middle Temple in 1975, where he was made a Bencher in 1998. He specialised in intellectual property law, and was a Junior Counsel to Her Majesty's Treasury (Patents) from 1987 to 1990, and was appointed a QC in 1990. He became a Judge of the High Court of Justice, Chancery Division, in 1997 and was knighted.

His first instance decision in the case brought by Prince Jefri of Brunei against his accountants KPMG was upheld by the House of Lords after being overturned by the Court of Appeal.

He was a regular speaker at the annual intellectual property conference at Fordham University in New York City, and taught at the Max Planck Institute in Munich. He was the first British judge to join the enlarged board of appeal of the European Patent Office in Munich. At least from 1 January 2003 to 21 December 2004, he was a legally qualified external (non-permanent) member of the Enlarged Board of Appeal of the European Patent Office (EPO).

He was promoted to the Court of Appeal and appointed a Lord Justice of Appeal upon the retirement of Lord Justice Chadwick on 4 November 2007.

== Personal life ==
Pumfrey kept a house in the Provence where he kept bees and hunted truffles. He enjoyed cycling in earlier years, and later took to BMW motorcycles. He was a member of the Garrick Club. A confirmed bachelor, he never married.

In the summer of 2007, he was diagnosed as suffering from an arrhythmic heart condition combined with high blood pressure and high cholesterol. He died on 24 December 2007, aged 56, following a stroke. His funeral took place on 14 January 2008 in Temple Church, London.

== Judgments ==
Justice Pumfrey ruled in the important copyright case of Navitaire v Easyjet (2004), where he found that the 'look and feel' of a computer program could not be protected by copyright law without access to the program's source code. The judgment is seen to be in line with the Directive on Computer Programs.

He decided the case of Cantor Fitzgerald v Tradition UK (2001), where he ruled that the 3,000 out of 77,000 lines of copied source code by Tradition's programmers would be substantial, it not being important to substantiality what use the program made out of the code, i.e. whether it could function without it or not, but it would be a substantial if the part taken was original.

He ruled in Sandman v Panasonic that a single create effort could result in both a literary and artistic copyright, giving the example of a calligraphic poem of a cat.

== Bibliography ==
- The Protection of Designs, contribution in International Intellectual Property and the Common Law World, edited by Charles E.F. Rickett and Graeme W. Austin, Oxford : Hart, 2000, ISBN 1-84113-179-2
