= UK RumFest =

Festival in the UK

- Country: United Kingdom

The UK RumFest is a festival promoting rum and related alcoholic beverages in the United Kingdom. The festival claims to be the largest exhibition of rum culture in the world.

== Background ==
The festival was founded by Global Rum Ambassador Ian Burrell in 2007, who was keen to promote rum as a drink. Burrell had worked in the drinks trade as a bartender since 1990. In 1998, he had started working with the Jamaican rum distiller, blender and bottler J. Wray and Nephew Ltd. The company initially employed Burrell on a part-time basis, leading to a full-time role in 2003. Burrell subsequently work for other drinks brands on an ad hoc basis and with organisations such as the West Indies Rum & Spirits Producers Association, which represents several different Caribbean rums. The UK Rumfest has led to the influence of rum festivals and fairs all over the world including The Miami Rum Renaissance festival, the Puerto Rico Rum Festival "Taste of Rum", the Berlin Rumfest, MidWest Rum Fest, California Rum Fest, Paris Rhum fest and the first rum festival in Mauritius.

== Current festival ==
The UK RumFest was initially launched in 2007. It is held annually in London.

Over the past eight years, the festival has seen a growth in exhibitors, and provides areas for both the general public and specialist / trade customers. The festival showcases more than 400 rums produced by a variety of distilleries, including Havana Club, Mount Gay and House of Angostura. It also features a programme of rum focused workshops, seminars and classes.

In October 2013, the UK RumFest also featured the Connoisseur’s Cove – an exclusive area of the exhibition reserved for specific attendees.

== Related events ==
The organisers of the festival, The Rum Experience have started a Rum Experience University which provides students with information about the rum trade. It covers rum and its production and advertising.
