= Edward Dutkiewicz =

British artist (1961–2007)

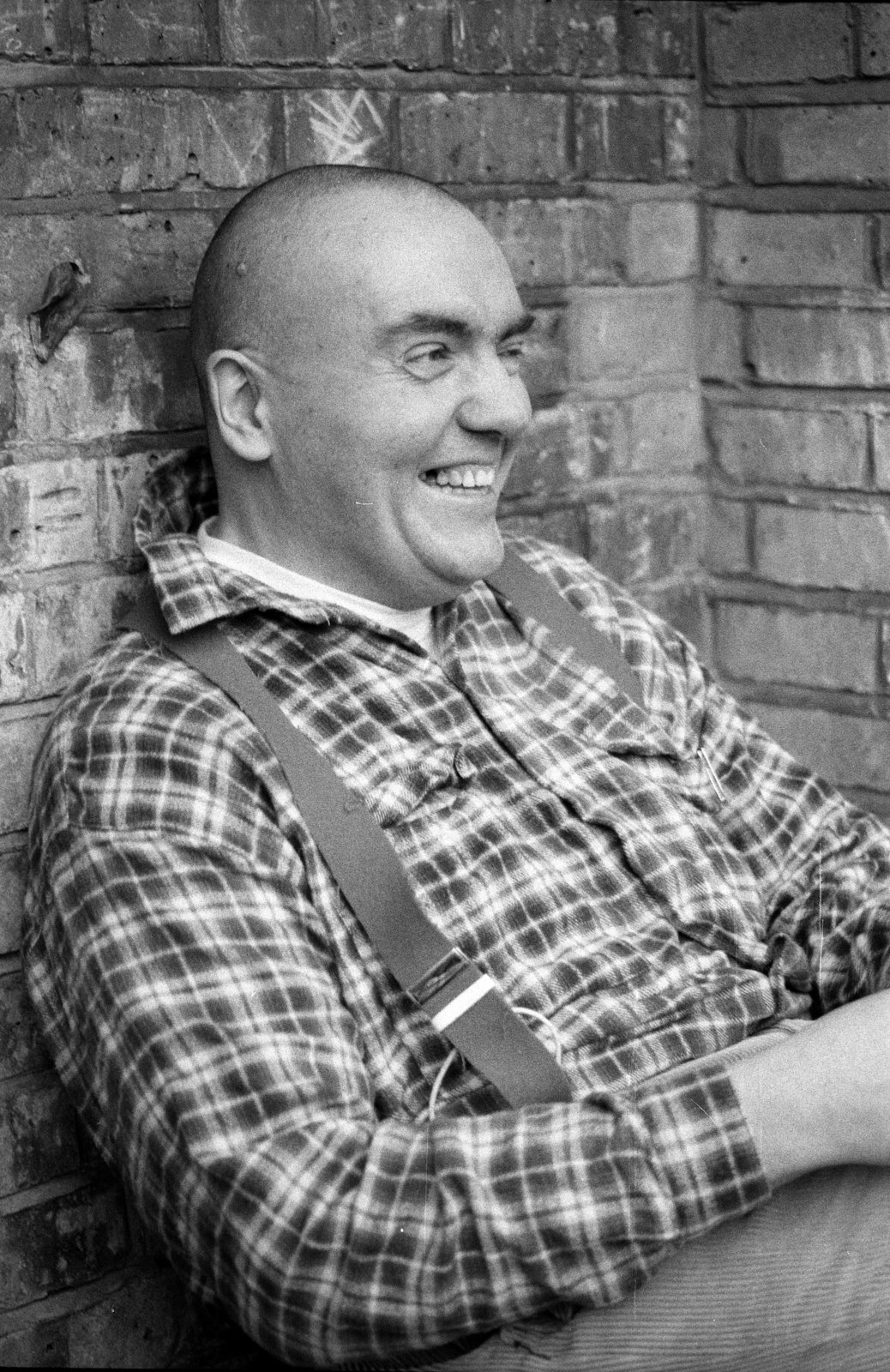
Portrait of Edward Dutkiewicz

Edward Dutkiewicz (1 April 1961 – 9 December 2007) was a British visual artist known for his use of bright colours and abstract forms, reminiscent of Alexander Calder and Henri Matisse.

== Life and work ==
Dutkiewicz was born to Polish immigrant parents in Tamworth, Staffordshire, on 1 April 1961.

A self-taught artist, between 1986 and 1994, Dutkiewicz produced wall paintings and murals for the London Borough of Tower Hamlets. He held two solo shows at Flowers East gallery in Hackney and later exhibited in Paris, Cologne, Stockholm, and San Francisco. Though he remained relatively unknown, he was regarded as a "serious" artist, producing expressionistic paintings and abstract sculptures.

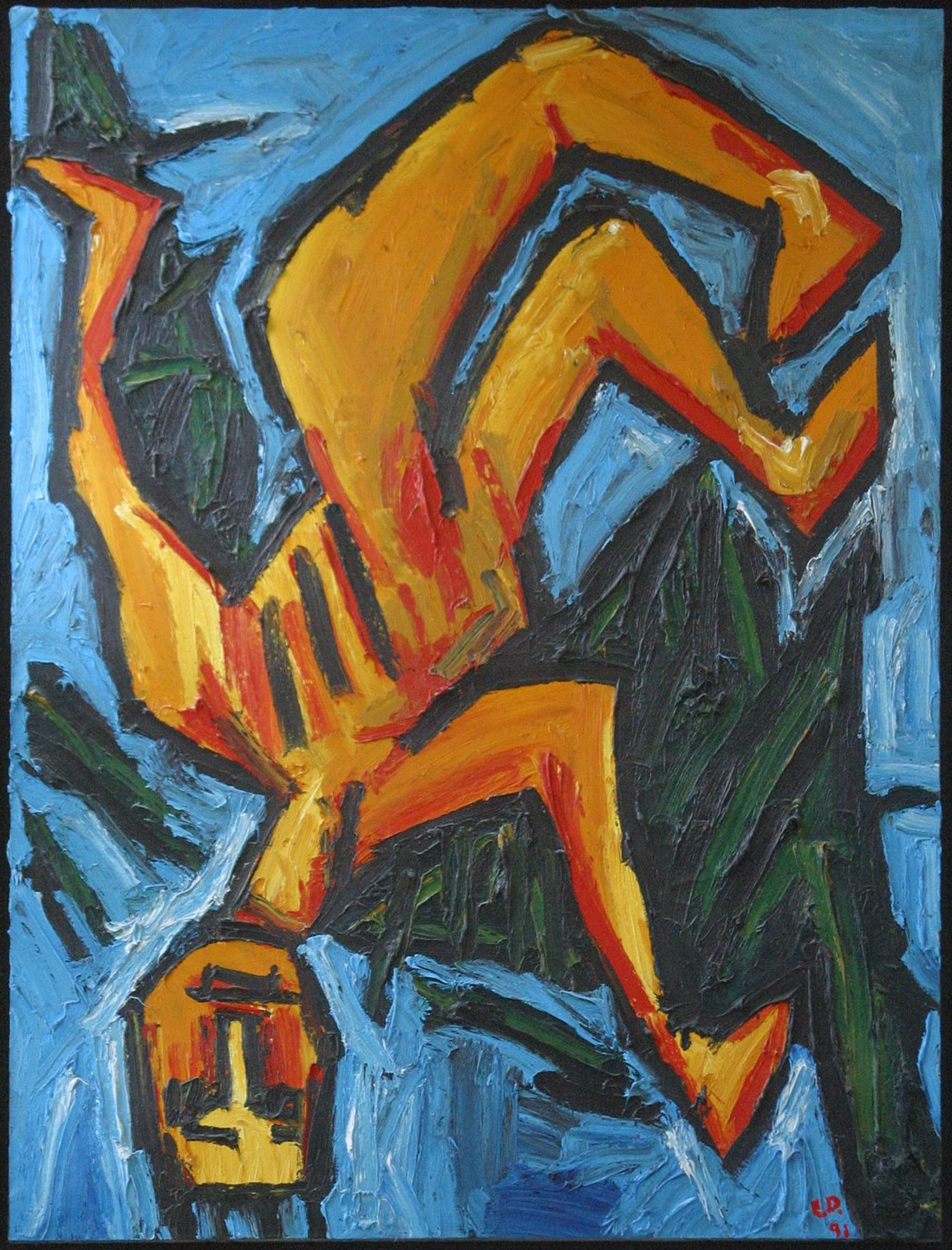
"Icarus" – oil on canvas by Edward Dutkiewicz, approx. 4ft x 6ft

Dutkiewicz received a number of commissions for his work, including from the architect Piers Gough, who placed one of his polished steel sculptures at Camden Lock, and from the Estorick Collection in Islington for a female portrait to be placed in their garden. Several of his works were also installed at Chelsea and Westminster Hospital. Additionally, Dutkiewicz sold several of his collages through the Paintings in Hospitals charity.

Dutkiewicz battled multiple sclerosis, with which he was diagnosed at the age of 21. By the time he was 40, he was no longer able to exhibit. During the last six months of his life, he was unable to use his hands at all and contemplated suicide. He died in London on 9 December 2007.

In an obituary of Dutkiewicz, collector Michael Estorick noted, "If there are echoes of Alexander Calder and Matisse in his use of bright colour and abstract form, it is also of their playfulness and joy. For sure, no one who has experienced so much pain has also expressed as much fun and the pleasure of simply being alive, or, for that matter, has given so much to those around him."
