= John Penn (architect) =

British architect (1921–2007)

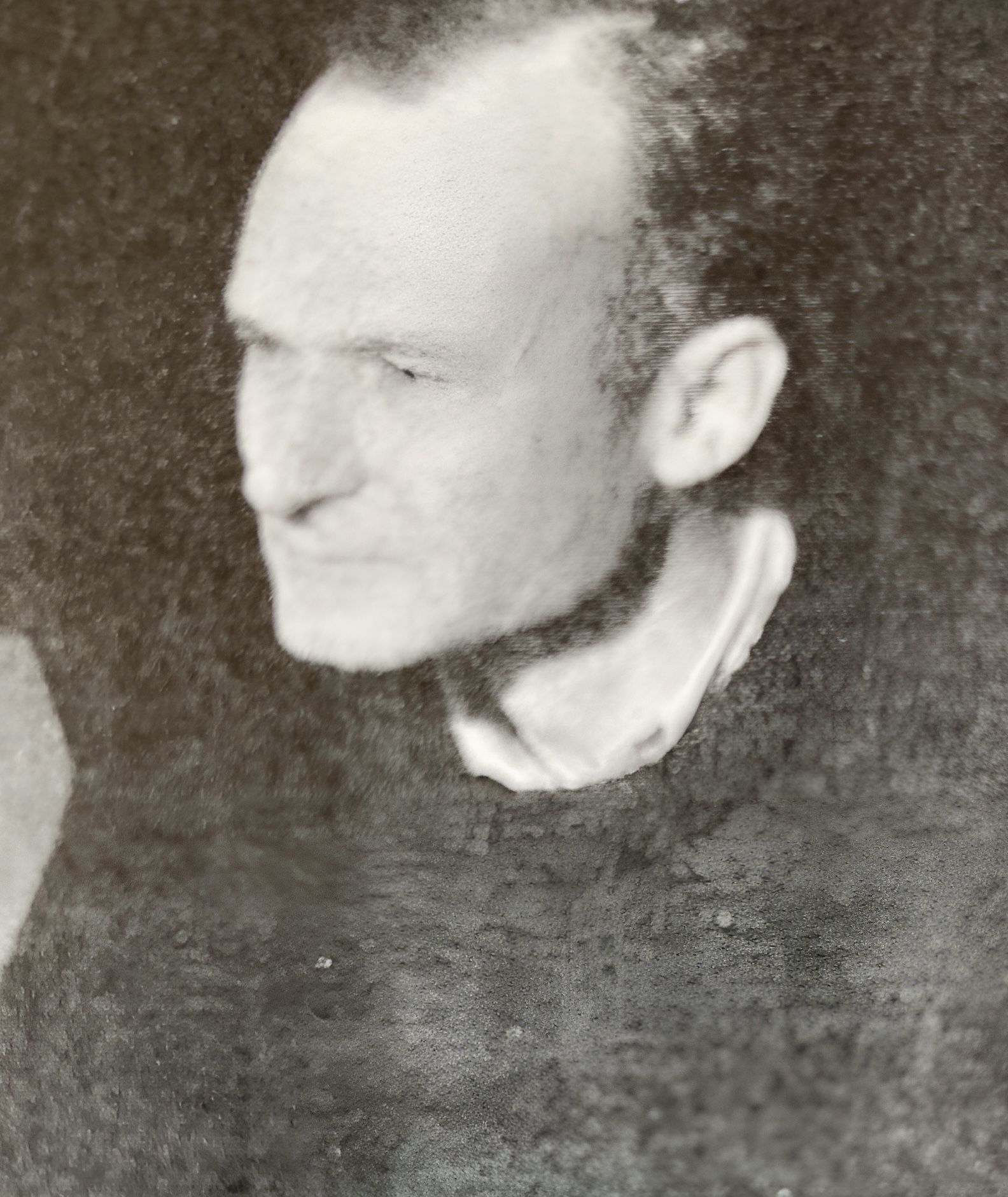
- c.1965
- Born: 11 March 1921; Greens Norton, England
- Died: 14 February 2007 (aged 85); Ipswich, Suffolk
- Education: Eton College, Trinity College, Cambridge, Architectural Association School of Architecture, London
- Occupations: Architect, Artist, Furniture Designer, Teacher, Musician, Poet and Filmmaker

John Penn (11 March 1921 – 14 February 2007) was a modernist British architect. He gained notability, and is best remembered, for the nine "temple-form" houses that he built in Suffolk between 1962 and 1969.In recent years these houses have been referred to as "Gold Dust".

== Early life and education ==
Penn was educated at Eton, and then at Trinity College, Cambridge. He studied history at Cambridge, and his studies were interrupted when he served in the Second World War. During his time in the military, he won the Military Cross for bravery.

== Career ==
He spent some time in the United States with Richard Neutra and his buildings were influenced by the Case Study Houses. His work includes a factory, and a pavilion for Trinity College, Cambridge, and several private houses in Suffolk.

== Artist ==
As an artist, Penn was greatly influenced by Rothko and American Abstract Expressionism. He first exhibited in San Francisco in 1952; in succeeding years, his work could be seen at one-man shows at various galleries in London and Suffolk.
