= Anthony Nuttall =

20th/21st-century English literary critic and academic

Anthony David Nuttall (25 April 1937 – 24 January 2007) was an English literary critic and academic.

== Biography ==
Nuttall was educated at Hereford Cathedral School, Watford Grammar School for Boys and Merton College, Oxford, where he studied both Classical Moderations and English Literature. As a postgraduate he wrote a B.Litt. thesis on Shakespeare's The Tempest subsequently published as Two Concepts of Allegory (1968), and considered by some to be his most original book. Nuttall first taught at Sussex University where he was successively lecturer, reader and professor of English and where his students included the philosopher A. C. Grayling and the critic and biographer Robert Fraser. After a tumultuous period as pro-vice-chancellor at Sussex, he moved on to New College, Oxford, in 1984, eventually being elected to an Oxford chair. His published works include studies of Shakespeare and works on the connections between philosophy and literature. Prominent among the first is Shakespeare the Thinker (2007), in which he criticised his earlier work as needlessly forcing Shakespeare into an abstract metaphysical framework. Instead, Nuttall attempted to undo this tradition through a 'pataphysical approach, where everyday objects such as eggs, tennis rackets, and other mundane phenomena acquire an absurd metalepsis in their satiric relation to Shakespeare's tragedies.' In a more philosophical tradition, A Common Sky traces the literary repercussions of both the English empiricist tradition and the idea of solipsism. His work is characterised throughout by wide reading (especially in classical sources), common sense, a deep and broad humanity, a robust sense of humour and by occasional—and sometimes eccentric—references to popular culture (In Shakespeare the Thinker, for example, he cites the TV series Wife Swap.) His elder brother Jeff Nuttall was a poet and an important figure in 1960s counterculture. To him he dedicated his book The Alternative Trinity, a study of the Gnostic tradition in English literature through Marlowe and Milton to William Blake, a poet to whom both brothers had been attracted in their youth, if in rather different ways. A bench outside the chapel of Merton is inscribed with his name together with that of his lifelong friend and college contemporary, Stephen Medcalf.

== Selected publications ==
- Two Concepts of Allegory: A Study of Shakespeare's The Tempest and the Logic of Allegorical. London: Routledge & K. Paul. 1967. LCCN 67092640.
- A Common Sky: Philosophy and the Literary Imagination. London: Chatto & Windus for Sussex University Press. 1974. ISBN 0856210307.
- Crime and Punishment: Murder as Philosophic Experiment. Edinburgh: Published for Sussex University Press by Scottish Academic Press. 1978. ISBN 0856210714.
- Overheard by God: Fiction and Prayer in Herbert, Milton, Dante, and St. John. London, New York: Methuen. 1980. ISBN 0416739806.
- A New Mimesis: Shakespeare and the Representation of Reality. London, New York: Methuen. 1983. ISBN 0416317804.
- Pope's "Essay on Man". London, Boston: Allen & Unwin. 1984. ISBN 0048000175.
- The Stoic in Love: Selected Essays on Literature and Ideas. New York, London: Harvester Wheatsheaf. 1989. ISBN 0745006140.
- Timon of Athens. New York: Harvester Wheatsheaf. 1989. ISBN 0710811187.
- Openings: Narrative Beginnings from the Epic to the Novel. Oxford: Clarendon Press. 1992. ISBN 0198117418.
- Why Does Tragedy Give Pleasure?. Oxford, New York: Clarendon Press. 1996. ISBN 0198183712.
- The Alternative Trinity: Gnostic Heresy in Marlowe, Milton, and Blake. Oxford, New York: Clarendon Press. 1998. ISBN 019818462X.
- Dead from the Waist Down: Scholars and Scholarship in Literature and the Popular Imagination. New Haven: Yale University Press. 2003. ISBN 0300098405.
- Shakespeare the Thinker. New Haven, London: Yale University Press. 2007. ISBN 978-0300119282.
