= John Anderson (British Army officer, born 1916) =

British Army general

Major-General Sir John Anderson KBE
- Born: 28 June 1916
- Died: 9 September 2007 (aged 91)
- Military career
- Allegiance: United Kingdom
- Branch: British Army
- Service years: 1936–1972
- Rank: Major-General
- Service number: 67073
- Unit: Royal Corps of Signals
- Conflicts: Second World War
- Awards: Knight Commander of the Order of the British Empire; Mentioned in dispatches

Major-General Sir John Evelyn Anderson KBE (28 June 1916 – 9 September 2007) was a senior British Army officer.

== Military career ==
Anderson entered the Royal Military Academy, Woolwich and was commissioned as a second lieutenant into the Royal Corps of Signals, British Army, on 30 January 1936.

During the Second World War (1939–1945) he fought in the North African campaign from 1941. Between December 1942 and September 1943 he served as a General Staff Officer (GSO) with HQ Eighth Army, before working as an Instructor at the Middle East Staff College until May 1944. He was promoted to lieutenant colonel in November 1944. Anderson then served with the Telecommunications Signal Division before serving as a staff officer with the Royal Signals Division, Supreme Headquarters Allied Expeditionary Force (SHAEF). He was mentioned in dispatches three times over the course of the war.

After the war Anderson was appointed senior instructor at the School of Signals before working at the War Office and then moved to New Zealand as Director New Zealand Signals. After a posting to the 11th Armoured Division with the British Army of the Rhine (BAOR), he went to London District as Chief Signals Officer before returning to BAOR as Commander Royal Signals, 7th Armoured Division. He was commander of the Royal Signals as Signals Officer-in-Chief. Anderson was made a Knight Commander of the Order of the British Empire in 1971 and retired from the British Army with the rank of major-general on 29 May 1972.
