= Deaths in December 2007 =

The following is a list of notable deaths in December 2007.

Entries for each day are listed alphabetically by surname. A typical entry lists information in the following sequence:

- Name, age, country of citizenship at birth, subsequent country of citizenship (if applicable), reason for notability, cause of death (if known), and reference.

== December 2007 ==
=== 1 ===
- Rasim Al-Jumaily, 69, Iraqi actor and comedian, kidney failure.
- Bill Buller, 78, Irish Olympic equestrian (1972).
- Jennifer Davidson, 38, American executive, senior vice president of programming and scheduling for Cartoon Network.
- Elisabeth Eybers, 92, South African-born poet.
- Tony Fall, 67, British rally driver and Opel Motorsport Team director, heart attack.
- Ken McGregor, 78, Australian tennis player, stomach cancer.
- Danny Newman, 88, American publicist for the Lyric Opera of Chicago, pulmonary fibrosis.
- Anton Rodgers, 74, British actor.
- Ivo Rojnica, 92, Croatian-Argentine war crimes suspect, businessman, diplomat, and intelligence agent.

=== 2 ===
- Jennifer Alexander, 35, Canadian-born American ballet dancer, traffic collision.
- Robert Orville Anderson, 90, American founder and former CEO of ARCO.
- Nelly Beltrán, 82, Argentine actress.
- Józef Gomoluch, 68, Polish footballer.
- Elizabeth Hardwick, 91, American co-founder of The New York Review of Books.
- Doreen Kartinyeri, 72, Ngarrindjeri elder and historian.
- David Maybury-Lewis, 78, British anthropologist.
- Eleonora Rossi Drago, 82, Italian actress, cerebral haemorrhage.
- Les Shannon, 81, English football player (Liverpool, Burnley) and manager (Bury, Blackpool).
- Thomas F. Torrance, 94, Scottish theologian.

=== 3 ===
- Art Arfons, 81, American jet-car driver and drag racer, three-time world land speed record holder.
- John Belgrave, 67, New Zealand public servant, Chief Ombudsman (2003–2007), cancer.
- Jaime Fuster, 66, Puerto Rican politician and jurist, Resident Commissioner (1985–1992), heart attack.
- Jack Kadwell, 88, Australian rugby league footballer.
- Susumu Katsumata, 63, Japanese manga artist and illustrator, melanoma.
- James Kemsley, 59, Australian cartoonist (Ginger Meggs), motor neurone disease.
- Keshav Meshram, 70, Indian writer and critic, lung cancer.
- Lord Bloody Wog Rolo, 62, Australian activist, renal cell carcinoma.
- Heloneida Studart, 76, Brazilian writer, essayist, playwright, journalist, advocate for women's rights, and political figure.

=== 4 ===
- Boško Antić, 63, Bosnian footballer and manager.
- Jake Gaudaur, 87, Canadian Commissioner of the Canadian Football League (1968–1984), cancer.
- Jay H. Gordon, 77, American politician, Vermont Auditor of Accounts (1965–1969), smoke inhalation.
- Stanley McArdle, 85, British admiral.
- Norval Morrisseau, 75, Canadian Ojibwe artist, founder of the Woodlands Style, Parkinson's disease.
- Pimp C, 33, American rapper (UGK), sleep apnea and accidental overdose.
- Chip Reese, 56, American professional poker player, heart attack.
- Herman Rose, 98, American cityscape painter, cancer.
- Carlos Valdes, 81, Cuban conga player, respiratory failure.

=== 5 ===
- Iosif Dan, 57, Romanian revolutionary, lung cancer.
- Madhukar Vasudev Dhond, 93, Indian literary and art critic.
- Christine Finn, 78, English actress.
- Robin Gloag, 64, British co-founder of Stagecoach Group, traffic collision.
- Mohamed Mohamed Habib, 93, Egyptian Olympic basketball player (1948).
- Arnold Hardy, 85, American Pulitzer Prize-winning photographer, complications from hip surgery.
- Robert A. Hawkins, 19, American mass murderer, suicide by gunshot.
- Andrew Imbrie, 86, American composer.
- Jillian Kesner-Graver, 58, American actress (Happy Days), Orson Welles historian, staph infection.
- Alois Kracher, 48, Austrian winemaker, pancreatic cancer.
- Peter Orton, 64, English television producer, cancer.
- George Paraskevaides, 91, Cypriot businessman (Joannou & Paraskevaides) and philanthropist.
- Karlheinz Stockhausen, 79, German composer.
- Tony Tenser, 87, British film producer.
- Harry Thomson Jones, 82, British racehorse trainer.
- Rene Villanueva, 53, Filipino playwright and author, stroke.
- John Winter, 83, Australian athlete, 1948 Olympics high jump gold medalist.

=== 6 ===
- Wolfgang Assbrock, 55, German politician, member of the CDU and Landtag of North Rhine-Westphalia.
- Ali Badawi, 67, Egyptian footballer and Olympian (1960).
- Mike Donkin, 56, British reporter and journalist (BBC News), cancer.
- Katy French, 24, Irish model, suspected overdose.
- Jacques Hébert, 84, Canadian politician, Senator (1983–1998).
- John Hill, 95, British politician, Conservative MP for South Norfolk (1955–1974).
- John Pilkington Hudson, 97, British horticulturist and bomb disposal expert.
- Gennadi Kinko, 65, Soviet Estonian Olympic rower (1976).
- Murray Klein, 84, American businessman, co-owner of New York City's Zabar's food emporium, lung cancer.
- Marcel Le Borgne, 68, French footballer and manager.
- Shelley Rohde, 74, British journalist and author.
- Ken Southworth, 89, American animator (Scooby-Doo, Q. T. Hush, He-Man and the Masters of the Universe), stroke.
- András Szőllősy, 86, Hungarian composer.

=== 7 ===
- Noel Forster, 75, British artist.
- Fuad Hassan, 78, Indonesian Minister of Education (1985–1993), cancer.
- John Hollowbread, 73, British football goalkeeper (Tottenham Hotspur, Southampton).
- Sartono Kartodirdjo, 86, Indonesian historian.
- Reijo Laksola, 55, Finnish Olympic ice hockey player (1976).

=== 8 ===
- Donald Burton, 73, British actor, husband of actress Carroll Baker, emphysema.
- George Chiga, 94, Canadian Olympic wrestler (1936).
- Ioan Fiscuteanu, 70, Romanian actor, colon cancer.
- Dmitry Grigorieff, 89, American Episcopalian prelate, dean emeritus of Saint Nicholas Cathedral in Washington, D.C., cardiac arrest.
- Roger King, 63, American TV executive (King World, CBS), developed Wheel of Fortune, Jeopardy! and The Oprah Winfrey Show, stroke.
- Gerardo García Pimentel, 24, Mexican crime reporter, shot.
- Al Scaduto, 79, American cartoonist (They'll Do It Every Time).

=== 9 ===
- John Stuart Archer, 64, British chemical engineer and academic administrator.
- István Borzsák, 92, Hungarian classical scholar.
- Edward Dutkiewicz, 46, British artist.
- Wayne Howard, 58, American comic book artist (Charlton Comics), heart attack.
- Apichet Kittikorncharoen, 25, Thai singer, brain injury.
- Jim Langley, 78, British footballer for England, Fulham, and QPR, heart attack.
- Matthew J. Murray, 24, American spree killer, suicide by gunshot.
- Elspeth Rostow, 90, American academic, University of Texas dean, widow of Walt Whitman Rostow, heart attack.
- Kurt Schmied, 81, Austrian footballer, former member of the national team.
- Thore Skogman, 76, Swedish musician, stroke.
- Rafael Sperafico, 26, Brazilian racing driver, race crash.
- J. Fife Symington Jr., 97, American diplomat to Trinidad and Tobago, complications of old age.
- Gordon Zahn, 84, American Catholic peace activist, co-founder of Pax Christi USA, complications of Alzheimer's disease.

=== 10 ===
- Frank Braynard, 91, American maritime writer and historian.
- Ashleigh Aston Moore, 26, American-born Canadian actress (Now and Then).
- George Morris, 76, American football player (Georgia Tech, San Francisco 49ers), apparent heart attack.
- Aqsa Parvez, 16, Canadian allegedly killed for refusing to wear hijab, strangled.
- Jerry Ricks, 67, American blues guitarist.
- James Roxburgh, 86, British Anglican prelate, Bishop of Barking.
- Gordon Samuels, 84, Australian governor of New South Wales (1996–2001).
- Henrietta Yurchenco, 91, American folklorist.

=== 11 ===
- Allan Bérubé, 61, American gay historian and writer, complications from stomach ulcers.
- José Luis Calva, 38, Mexican writer, serial killer and cannibal, suicide by hanging.
- Yuriy Chervochkin, 22, Russian opposition activist, beating.
- Freddie Fields, 84, American Hollywood agent, producer and studio executive, lung cancer.
- Pat Hannigan, 71, Canadian ice hockey player (Toronto Maple Leafs, New York Rangers, Philadelphia Flyers).
- Christie Hennessy, 62, Irish singer and songwriter, cancer.
- André Huguenin, 78, Swiss Olympic cross-country skier (1956).
- Nicholas Kao Se Tseien, 110, Chinese supercentenarian, world's oldest Catholic priest.
- Carl Ludwig, Archduke of Austria, 89, Austrian son of Emperor Charles I of Austria.
- Ottomar Pinto, 76, Brazilian politician, Governor of Roraima (2004–2007), heart attack.
- Tatsuzō Shimaoka, 88, Japanese potter, living national treasure, acute liver failure.
- Terry Yates, 57, American biologist, discovered source of hantavirus, brain cancer.

=== 12 ===
- Basuki, 51, Indonesian comedian.
- Gary Battistella, 67, Canadian Olympic alpine skier (1964).
- Ted Corbitt, 88, American ultramarathon runner and Olympian (1952), respiratory complications.
- Shawn Eckardt, 40, American bodyguard and businessman, conspired to assault Nancy Kerrigan, natural causes.
- Ricardo García, 52, Costa Rican footballer and Olympian (1980).
- Forrest Griffith, 79, American football player (Kansas Jayhawks, New York Giants).
- Josep Guinovart, 80, Spanish artist.
- François al-Hajj, 54, Lebanese Army general, roadside bomb.
- William Hamilton, 86, Swedish Olympic equestrian (1964).
- Rosemarie Koczy, 72, Holocaust survivor, German artist and teacher known for her many works dealing with the Holocaust.
- Márcio Montarroyos, 59, Brazilian jazz trumpeter, lung cancer.
- Jim Nevill, 80, British police officer, former head of Scotland Yard anti-terrorist squad.
- Alfons Maria Stickler, 97, Austrian prelate of the Roman Catholic Church.
- Ike Turner, 76, American R&B musician and record producer, ex-husband of singer Tina Turner, cocaine overdose.
- Schuster Vance, 47, American actor, cancer.
- Lee Vincent, 91, American bassist and radio personality (WILK), heart failure.
- Yuli Vorontsov, 78, Russian diplomat, former ambassador to the United Nations and United States.

=== 13 ===
- Philippe Clay, 80, French singer and actor.
- Fuat Deniz, 40, Swedish-Assyrian sociologist, stabbed.
- Wiggo Hanssen, 84, Norwegian Olympic speed skater (1952).
- Laura Huxley, 96, American musician and author, widow of Aldous Huxley, cancer.
- Jan Jakub Kotík, 35, Czech artist and rock drummer, cancer.
- Alain Payet, 60, French adult film director.
- Robert Russin, 93, American sculptor.
- Floyd Westerman, 71, American musician, actor (Dances With Wolves, Walker, Texas Ranger, Hidalgo) and Native American activist, leukemia.

=== 14 ===
- Issam Al Zaim, 67, Syrian economist, former Minister of Industry, heart attack.
- Hank Kaplan, 87, American boxing historian, cancer.
- Maria Lauterbach, 20, American marine and murder victim.
- Cuddles Marshall, 82, American baseball player (New York Yankees).
- Frank Morgan, 73, American saxophonist.
- Johnny Science, 52, American drag king, heart failure.
- Emory Sekaquaptewa, 78, American indigenous Hopi anthropologist.
- Krishna Srinivas, 94, Indian poet and writer.
- Jan Švéda, 76, Czech Olympic rower.

=== 15 ===
- John Berg, 58, American actor, suicide by carbon monoxide poisoning.
- Jean Bottéro, 93, French Assyriologist.
- St. Clair Bourne, 64, American documentary filmmaker (Half Past Autumn), pulmonary embolism.
- Julia Carson, 69, American member of the House of Representatives from Indiana since 1997, lung cancer.
- Gerard Fairtlough, 77, British biochemist and entrepreneur.
- Andrzeja Górska, 91, Polish nun, abbess of the Grey Ursulines.
- Ryan Gracie, 33, Brazilian martial artist.
- Ludovic Heraud, 94, French Olympic sports shooter (1952).
- Tadayuki Inoue, 72, Japanese baseball player.
- Clem Jones, 89, Australian Lord Mayor of Brisbane (1961–1975), pneumonia.
- Matjaž Klopčič, 73, Slovenian film director.
- Diane Middlebrook, 68, American biographer and poet, cancer.
- Caetano N'Tchama, 52, Bissau-Guinean politician, Prime Minister (2000-2001).
- Giuseppe Rinaldi, 88, Italian actor and voice actor.
- Tejeshwar Singh, 60, Indian publisher, newsreader and theatre activist, cardiac arrest.
- Ace Vergel, 55, Filipino actor, cardiac arrest.
- Jonathan Witchell, 33, British BBC reporter for Radio Kent.

=== 16 ===
- Joe Ethridge, 79, American football player (Green Bay Packers).
- Dan Fogelberg, 56, American singer-songwriter ("Same Old Lang Syne"), prostate cancer.
- Harald Genzmer, 98, German composer of classical music.
- Ismail Gulgee, 81, Pakistani painter, strangled.
- Jim Holstein, 77, American basketball player (Cincinnati Bearcats, Minneapolis Lakers, Fort Wayne Pistons).
- Serge Vinçon, 58, French politician.

=== 17 ===
- Don Chevrier, 69, Canadian sportscaster.
- Joel Dorn, 65, American jazz, pop and R&B record producer, heart attack.
- Jim Holstein, 77, American basketball player (Minneapolis Lakers).
- Tom Murphy, 83, American politician, speaker of the Georgia House of Representatives (1973–2002), complications of a stroke.
- Celestino Piatti, 85, Swiss graphic artist, painter and book designer.
- Marnesba Tackett, 99, American civil rights activist.
- Jack Zander, 99, American animator (Tom and Jerry).

=== 18 ===
- Walter Bowart, 68, American co-founder of East Village Other, colon cancer.
- Fred Bukaty, 71, American football player (Denver Broncos).
- Gerald Le Dain, 83, Canadian jurist, Justice of the Supreme Court.
- Carl Graff-Wang, 64, Norwegian Olympic handball player (1972).
- John Güttke, 76, Swedish Olympic biathlete (1964).
- Samuel Karlin, 83, American mathematician, heart attack.
- Jack Linkletter, 70, American television host, lymphoma.
- Motiur Rahman, 58, Indian politician, Rashtriya Janata Dal member of the Rajya Sabha since 2005, heart attack.
- Bill Strauss, 60, American writer and satirist, founder of political comedy group Capitol Steps, pancreatic cancer.
- Alan Wagner, American television executive, radio personality, writer, and opera historian and critic as CantaJuego, Los Pica Pica, Your Baby Can Read, Galinha Pintadinha, Plim Plim, and Luli Pampin

=== 19 ===
- Frank Capra Jr., 73, American movie studio executive, son of director Frank Capra, prostate cancer.
- James Costigan, 81, American actor and television writer (Eleanor and Franklin), heart failure.
- Desmond C. Derbyshire, 83, British linguist.
- John A. Garraty, 87, American historian, heart failure.
- Pat Lamberti, 70, American football player (New York Titans, Denver Broncos).
- Dapper O'Neil, 87, American politician, Boston City Council (1971–1999).

=== 20 ===
- Tommy Byrne, 87, American baseball player.
- Jeanne Carmen, 77, American actress and pin-up girl, lymphoma.
- Arabella Churchill, 58, British founder of Children's World charity, granddaughter of Sir Winston Churchill, pancreatic cancer.
- Russell Coffey, 109, American serviceman, one of three known remaining American veterans of World War I.
- Lorne Davis, 77, Canadian ice hockey player (Montreal Canadiens) and scout (Edmonton Oilers).
- Ted Finn, 68, Canadian intelligence official, director of CSIS (1984–1987).
- John Gibbs, 90, British Anglican prelate, Bishop of Coventry (1976–1985).
- Peer Hultberg, 72, Danish author and psychoanalyst.
- Geoffrey Martin, 79, British historian and Keeper of the Public Records (1982–1988).
- Lydia Mendoza, 91, American Tejano music singer and guitarist.
- Raphaël Nguyễn Văn Diệp, 81, Vietnamese Roman Catholic prelate, coadjutor bishop of Vĩnh Long (1975–2007).
- Robbie Williams, 45, Australian politician, first Indigenous Australian Brisbane City councillor, former ATSIC commissioner, heart attack.

=== 21 ===
- Adolfas Akelaitis, 97, Lithuanian Olympic high jumper (1928).
- Carol Bly, 77, American author and poet, ovarian cancer.
- Ken Hendricks, 66, American contractor and billionaire, fall from roof.
- Hans Imhoff, 85, German businessman, founder of Imhoff Chocolate Museum in Cologne.
- Jack Lamabe, 71, American Major League Baseball pitcher.
- Ken Lee, 75, Chinese-born Australian businessman, owner and co-founder of Bing Lee superstores, cancer.
- Saadia Marciano, 57, Israeli Black Panthers leader, member of the Knesset.
- Norton Nascimento, 45, Brazilian actor, heart failure.
- Jeani Read, 60, Canadian journalist, cancer.
- Battista Serioli, 107, Italian World War I veteran.

=== 22 ===
- Joe Ames, 86, American singer (Ames Brothers), heart attack.
- Philip Bednall, 76, Australian cricketer.
- Chrysostomos I of Cyprus, 80, Cypriot prelate, Archbishop of Cyprus (1977–2006).
- Sir Charles Court, 96, Australian politician, Premier of Western Australia (1974–1982).
- Andy Davis, 80, American football player (Washington Redskins).
- Sylvan Fox, 79, American journalist, complications from pneumonia.
- Andrew Glyn, 64, British economist.
- Julien Gracq, 97, French writer.
- Lucien Teisseire, 88, French road bicycle racer.
- Marvin Wachman, 90, American historian, President of Lincoln University and Temple University, heart failure.
- Ruth Wallis, 87, American singer-songwriter, complications of Alzheimer's disease.
- Takashi Yamamoto, 58, Japanese politician.

=== 23 ===
- Dale Baird, 71, American thoroughbred horse trainer, traffic collision.
- Donald Chant, 79, Canadian biologist and environmental advocate.
- Evelyn Gandy, 87, American politician, Lieutenant Governor of Mississippi (1976–1980).
- William Francis Ganong Jr., 83, American neuroendocrinologist, prostate cancer.
- Rick Holbrook, 59, American Olympic weightlifter (1972).
- Michael Kidd, 92, American film and stage choreographer, cancer.
- Aloísio Lorscheider, 83, Brazilian Roman Catholic prelate and cardinal, heart failure.
- Tyler MacDuff, 82, American actor.
- Hans Mild, 73, Swedish footballer and ice hockey player.
- Oscar Peterson, 82, Canadian jazz pianist, kidney failure and complications from a stroke.
- Rhoda Pritzker, 93, American philanthropist, member of the Pritzker family.
- José Ferreira Queimado, 94, Portuguese former chairman of S.L. Benfica, after long illness.
- Kevin Sinclair, 65, New Zealand-born Hong Kong reporter, editor and columnist for the South China Morning Post, cancer.
- Osvaldo Reyes, 88, Chilean painter, stroke.
- Robert Stump, 86, American physicist.
- Frank Swaelen, 77, Belgian politician, former president of the Senate and minister of state.

=== 24 ===
- Jim Angel, 67, Australian radio newsreader, stroke.
- Cláudio Camunguelo, 60, Brazilian composer and singer, diabetes.
- Reinhard Heß, 62, German ski jumping coach, pancreatic cancer.
- Wilhelmina Jashemski, 97, American archaeologist, renal failure.
- Andreas Matzbacher, 25, Austrian cyclist, traffic collision.
- Pudgy, 61, American stand-up comedian, heart attack.
- Sir Nicholas Pumfrey, 56, British judge, stroke.
- George Warrington, 55, American transportation official, President of Amtrak (1998–2002), pancreatic cancer.

=== 25 ===
- Jim Beauchamp, 68, American Major League Baseball player and coach, leukemia.
- Tommy Harmer, 79, British footballer (Tottenham Hotspur, Watford and Chelsea).
- John Hayes, 80, New Zealand test cricketer.
- Pat Kirkwood, 86, British actress, Alzheimer's disease.
- Hugh Massingberd, 60, British genealogist and journalist, former Daily Telegraph obituary editor.
- Mighty King Kong, 34, Kenyan reggae musician.
- William MacDonald, 90, American Christian author.
- Hans Otte, 81, German avant-garde composer and pianist.
- G. P. Sippy, 93, Indian film producer and director.
- Carlos Eduardo Sousa Jr., 17, American student, tiger attack.
- Tatiana, 4, American-born Siberian tiger at San Francisco Zoo, mauled a visitor to death, shot.
- Sir George Vallings, 75, British vice admiral, throat cancer.

=== 26 ===
- Raúl Bernao, 66, Argentine footballer, hepatitis.
- Sir Phillip Bridges, 85, British barrister and judge, Chief Justice of the Gambia.
- Jim Castiglia, 89, American football and baseball player, natural causes.
- Joe Dolan, 68, Irish singer and entertainer, brain haemorrhage.
- Andrew Grima, 86, British jeweller.
- Voitto Liukkonen, 67, Finnish sports commentator.
- Paul D. MacLean, 94, American physician, developed triune brain concept, heart attack.
- Nina Menshikova, 79, Russian actress.
- Stu Nahan, 81, American sportscaster, lymphoma.
- John Pappenheimer, 92, American physiologist, respiratory failure.

=== 27 ===
- Kit Ahern, 92, Irish politician.
- Ben D. Altamirano, 77, American politician, member of the New Mexico Senate since 1971, heart attack.
- Ben Bamfuchile, 47, Zambian coach of the Namibia national football team, after short illness.
- Benazir Bhutto, 54, Pakistani opposition leader and former prime minister (1988–1990, 1993–1996), assassinated.
- Edward A. Brennan, 73, American businessman, former chairman of Sears, Roebuck and Company.
- Sir Howard Colvin, 88, British architectural historian.
- Steven Florio, 58, American businessman, former CEO of Condé Nast, heart attack.
- Jerzy Kawalerowicz, 85, Polish film director.
- Jaan Kross, 87, Estonian writer.
- Ed LaDou, 52, American pizza chef, popularized gourmet California-style pizzas, cancer.
- Marie-Jeanne, 87, American ballet dancer, congestive heart failure
- Pedro Gastão of Orléans-Braganza, 94, Brazilian pretender to the title Emperor of Brazil.
- Peter Wing, 93, Canadian politician, mayor of Kamloops, North America's first mayor of Chinese descent, stroke.

=== 28 ===
- Aidin Nikkhah Bahrami, 25, Iranian basketball player, traffic collision.
- Jiří Pauer, 88, Czech composer, theatre director and academic.
- Serigne Saliou Mbacké, 92, Senegalese religious leader, fifth caliph of the Mouride Islamic movement.
- Amarnath Sehgal, 85, Indian sculptor.
- Sun Daolin, 86, Chinese actor.
- Tab Thacker, 45, American wrestler and actor (Police Academy, City Heat, Wildcats), complications from diabetes.

=== 29 ===
- Olayr Coan, 48, Brazilian actor and theater director, traffic collision.
- Phil Dusenberry, 71, American advertising executive, lung cancer.
- Kevin Greening, 44, British former BBC Radio 1 disc jockey.
- Vincent Gruppuso, 67, American businessman, founder of Kozy Shack puddings, complications from diabetes.
- Abdullah ibn Husayn al-Ahmar, 74, Yemeni politician, Parliamentary speaker since 1993, cancer.
- Joan Ingpen, 91, British classical music manager (Ingpen & Williams), launched the career of Luciano Pavarotti.
- Rex King-Clark, 94, British soldier and racing driver.
- Robert Morris, 81, English cricketer.
- Nonja, 55, Indonesian Sumatran orangutan thought to be world's oldest.
- Phil O'Donnell, 35, Scottish footballer (Motherwell) with one Scotland cap, heart failure.
- Scott M. Robinson, 54, American key grip.
- H. D. Thoreau Jr., 84, American track-and-field authority and Olympics official, complications from Alzheimer's and stroke.
- Shu Uemura, 79, Japanese makeup artist, pneumonia.

=== 30 ===
- Bert Bolin, 82, Swedish meteorologist, stomach cancer.
- Themis Cholevas, 81, Greek basketball player and Olympian (1952).
- Kinkri Devi, 82, Indian environmentalist.
- Laila Kaland, 68, Norwegian politician, MP (1985–2001), after long illness.
- Jorge Machiñena, 71, Uruguayan deputy (1985–2000), President of the Chamber (1996–1997), heart attack.
- Leonard B. Meyer, 89, American musicologist.
- Victor Navarra, 55, American coordinator for New York Marathon, cancer.
- Doreen Norton, 85, British nursing pioneer.
- Willie Robinson, 81, American blues singer, injuries from a fire.
- Louis Wolfson, 95, American businessman, bred and raced 1978 U.S. Triple Crown champion Affirmed, Alzheimer's disease and colon cancer.

=== 31 ===
- Alberto Alonso, 90, Cuban dancer and choreographer, heart attack.
- Tommy Dickson, 78, British footballer (Linfield, Northern Ireland), after long illness.
- Tony Elliott, 48, American football player (New Orleans Saints), natural causes.
- Ralph Emmerson, 94, British Anglican prelate, Bishop of Knaresborough (1972–1979).
- Michael Goldberg, 83, American abstract expressionist painter, heart attack.
- Bill Idelson, 88, American actor and script writer, complications from a broken hip.
- Kathryn Ish, 71, American television, voiceover and theater actress (Laverne & Shirley), cancer.
- Milton L. Klein, 97, Canadian politician, MP for Cartier (1963–1968).
- Markku Peltola, 51, Finnish actor and musician.
- Muhammad Osman Said, 85, Libyan Prime Minister (1960–1963).
- Ettore Sottsass, 90, Italian designer, heart failure.
