= Tadayuki =

- Gender: Male

Origin
- Origin: Japanese
- Meaning: Different meanings depending on the kanji used

Tadayuki (written: 忠恭, 忠之, 忠移, 忠進, 忠幸 or 忠行) is a masculine Japanese given name. Notable people with the name include:

- Tadayuki Inoue (井上 忠行; 1935–2007), Japanese baseball player
- Makino Tadayuki (牧野 忠恭; 1824–1878), Japanese daimyō of the late Edo period
- Mizuno Tadayuki (水野 忠之; 1669–1731), Japanese daimyō of the Edo period
- Nishio Tadayuki (西尾 忠移; 1746–1801), Japanese daimyō who ruled the Yokosuka Domain, and lived from the mid to late Edo period
- Sakai Tadayuki (酒井 忠進; 1770–1828), Japanese daimyō of the mid to late Edo period, who ruled the Obama Domain
- Tadayuki Kawahito (川人 忠幸; born 1947), Japanese photographer
- Tadayuki Maruyama (丸山 忠行; born 1942), Japanese boxer
- Tadayuki Naitoh (内藤 忠行; born 1941), Japanese photographer
- Tadayuki Okada (born 1967), Japanese motorcycle racer
- Tadayuki Takahashi (高橋 忠之; born 1956), Japanese figure skater and coach
