= Witchell =

Witchell is a surname. Notable people with the surname include:

- Henry Witchell (1906–1965), English cricketer
- Jonathan Witchell (1974–2007), British journalist
- Nicholas Witchell (born 1953), English journalist and news presenter

== See also ==
- Mitchell (surname)
