= Terroux =

Terroux may refer to:

== People ==
- Élisabeth Terroux (1759–1822), French-Swiss painter

== Places ==
- Saint-Julien-du-Terroux, commune in Mayenne, Pays de la Loire, France

== See also ==
- Terrou
- Theroux
