= Tacitus =

Roman historian and senator (56–120)

Cornelius Tacitus
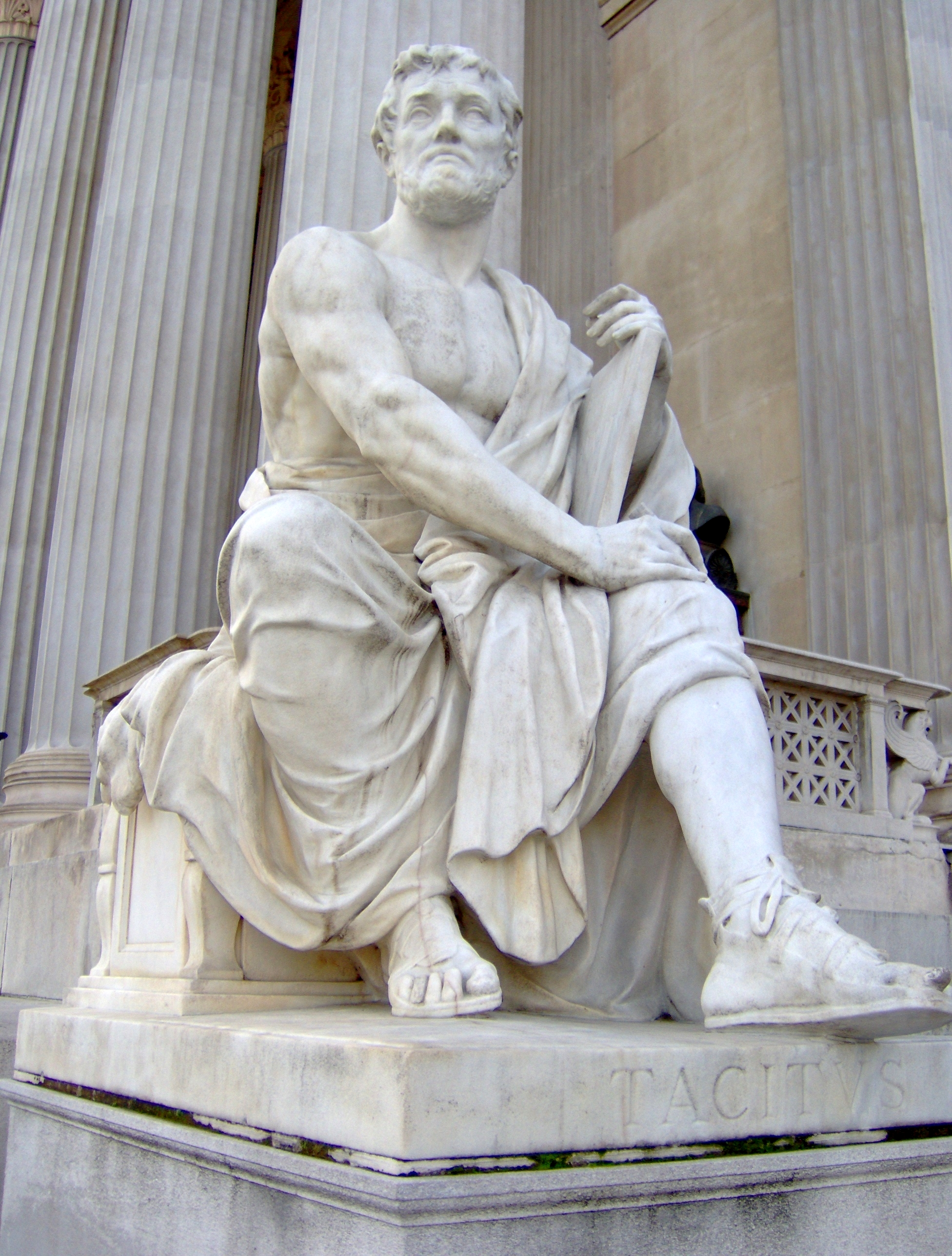
- Statue of Tacitus outside the Austrian Parliament Building
- Born: c. AD 56
- Died: c. AD 120 (aged approx. 64)
- Occupations: Historian, politician
- Years active: Silver Age of Latin

Academic background
- Influences: Thucydides; Fabius Rusticus; Sallust; Livy; Marcus Cluvius Rufus; Pliny the Elder; Quintilian

Academic work
- Discipline: History
- Main interests: History, biography, oratory
- Notable works: Agricola; Annals; Dialogus de oratoribus Germania; Histories

Publius Cornelius Tacitus, (Note: His full nomenclature may have been "Publius Cornelius Tacitus Caecina Paetus".) known simply as Tacitus (/ˈtæsɪtəs/ TAS-it-əs, Latin: [ˈtakɪtʊs]; c. AD 56 – c. 120), was a Roman historian and politician. He is widely regarded as one of the greatest Roman historians by modern scholars.

His two major historical works, Annals (Latin: Annales) and the Histories (Latin: Historiae), originally formed a continuous narrative of the Roman Empire from the death of Augustus (14 AD) to the end of Domitian's reign (96 AD). The surviving portions of the Annals focus on the reigns of Tiberius, Claudius, Nero, and those who reigned in the Year of the Four Emperors (69 AD).

His other writings discuss oratory (in dialogue format, see Dialogus de oratoribus), Germania (in De origine et situ Germanorum), and the life of his father-in-law, Agricola (the general responsible for much of the Roman conquest of Britain), mainly focusing on his campaign in Britannia (De vita et moribus Iulii Agricolae).

== Life ==
Details about the personal life of Tacitus are scarce. What little is known comes from scattered hints throughout his work, the letters of his friend and admirer Pliny the Younger, and an inscription found at Mylasa in Caria in what is now Turkey.

He was born in 56 or 57 to an equestrian family. The place and date of his birth, as well as his praenomen (first name) are not known. In the letters of Sidonius Apollinaris his name is Gaius, but in the major surviving manuscript of his work his name is given as Publius. One scholar's suggestion of the name Sextus has been largely rejected.

=== Family and early life ===
Most of the older aristocratic families failed to survive the proscriptions which took place at the end of the Republic, and Tacitus makes it clear that he owed his rank to the Flavian emperors (Hist. 1.1). The claim that he was descended from a freedman is derived from a speech in his writings which asserts that many senators and knights were descended from freedmen (Ann. 13.27), but this is generally disputed.

In his article on Tacitus in Pauly-Wissowa, I. Borzsak conjectured that the historian was related to Thrasea Paetus and the Etruscan family of the Caecinii, about whom he spoke very highly. Furthermore, some later Caecinii bore the cognomen Tacitus, which also could indicate some sort of relationship. It has been suggested that the historian's mother was a daughter of Aulus Caecina Paetus, suffect consul of 37, and sister of Arria, wife of Thrasea.

His father may have been the Cornelius Tacitus who served as procurator of Belgica and Germania; Pliny the Elder mentions that Cornelius had a son who aged rapidly (NH 7.76), which implies an early death. There is no mention of Tacitus's suffering from such a condition, but it is possible that this refers to a brother—if Cornelius was indeed his father.

The friendship between the younger Pliny and Tacitus leads some scholars to conclude that they were both the offspring of wealthy provincial families.

The province of his birth remains unknown, though various conjectures suggest Gallia Belgica, Gallia Narbonensis, or Northern Italy. His marriage to the daughter of the Narbonensian senator Gnaeus Julius Agricola implies that he came from Gallia Narbonensis. Tacitus's dedication to Lucius Fabius Justus in the Dialogus may indicate a connection with Spain, and his friendship with Pliny suggests origins in northern Italy.

No evidence exists, however, that Pliny's friends from northern Italy knew Tacitus, nor do Pliny's letters hint that the two men had a common background. Pliny Book 9, Letter 23, reports that when asked whether he was Italian or provincial, he gave an unclear answer and so was asked whether he was Tacitus or Pliny. Since Pliny was from Italy, some infer that Tacitus was from the provinces, probably Gallia Narbonensis.

His ancestry, his skill in oratory, and his sympathetic depiction of barbarians who resisted Roman rule (e.g., Ann. 2.9) have led some to suggest that he was a Celt. This belief stems from the fact that the Celts who had occupied Gaul prior to the Roman invasion were famous for their skill in oratory and had been subjugated by Rome.

=== Public life, marriage, and literary career ===
As a young man, Tacitus studied rhetoric in Rome to prepare for a career in law and politics; like Pliny, he may have studied under Quintilian (c. 35 AD – c. 100). In 77 or 78, he married Julia Agricola, daughter of the famous general Agricola.

Little is known of their domestic life, save that Tacitus loved hunting and the outdoors. He started his career (probably the latus clavus, mark of the senator) under Vespasian (r. 69–79), but entered political life as a quaestor in 81 or 82 under Titus.

He advanced steadily through the cursus honorum, becoming praetor in 88 and a quindecimvir, a member of the priestly college in charge of the Sibylline Books and the Secular Games. He gained acclaim as a lawyer and as an orator; his skill in public speaking ironically counterpoints his cognomen, Tacitus ("silent").

He served in the provinces from c. 89 to c. 93, either in command of a legion or in a civilian post. He and his property survived Domitian's reign of terror (81–96), but the experience left him jaded and perhaps ashamed at his own complicity, instilling in him the hatred of tyranny evident in his works. The Agricola, chs. 44–45, is illustrative:

Agricola was spared those later years during which Domitian, leaving now no interval or breathing space of time, but, as it were, with one continuous blow, drained the life-blood of the Commonwealth... It was not long before our hands dragged Helvidius to prison, before we gazed on the dying looks of Mauricus and Rusticus, before we were steeped in Senecio's innocent blood. Even Nero turned his eyes away, and did not gaze upon the atrocities which he ordered; with Domitian it was the chief part of our miseries to see and to be seen, to know that our sighs were being recorded...

From his seat in the Senate, he became suffect consul in 97 during the reign of Nerva, being the first of his family to do so. During his tenure, he reached the height of his fame as an orator when he delivered the funeral oration for the famous veteran soldier Lucius Verginius Rufus.

In the following year, he wrote and published the Agricola and Germania, foreshadowing the literary endeavors that would occupy him until his death.

Afterward, he absented himself from public life, but returned during Trajan's reign (98–117). In 100, he and his friend Pliny the Younger prosecuted Marius Priscus (proconsul of Africa) for corruption. Priscus was found guilty and sent into exile; Pliny wrote a few days later that Tacitus had spoken "with all the majesty which characterizes his usual style of oratory".

A lengthy absence from politics and law followed while he wrote the Histories and the Annals. In 112 to 113, he held the highest civilian governorship, that of the Roman province of Asia in western Anatolia, recorded in the inscription found at Mylasa mentioned above. A passage in the Annals fixes 116 as the terminus post quem of his death, which may have been as late as 125 or even 130. It seems that he survived both Pliny (died c. 113) and Trajan (died 117).

It remains unknown whether Tacitus had any children. The Augustan History reports that Emperor Marcus Claudius Tacitus (r. 275–276) claimed him for an ancestor and provided for the preservation of his works, but this story may be fraudulent, like much of the Augustan History.

== Works ==
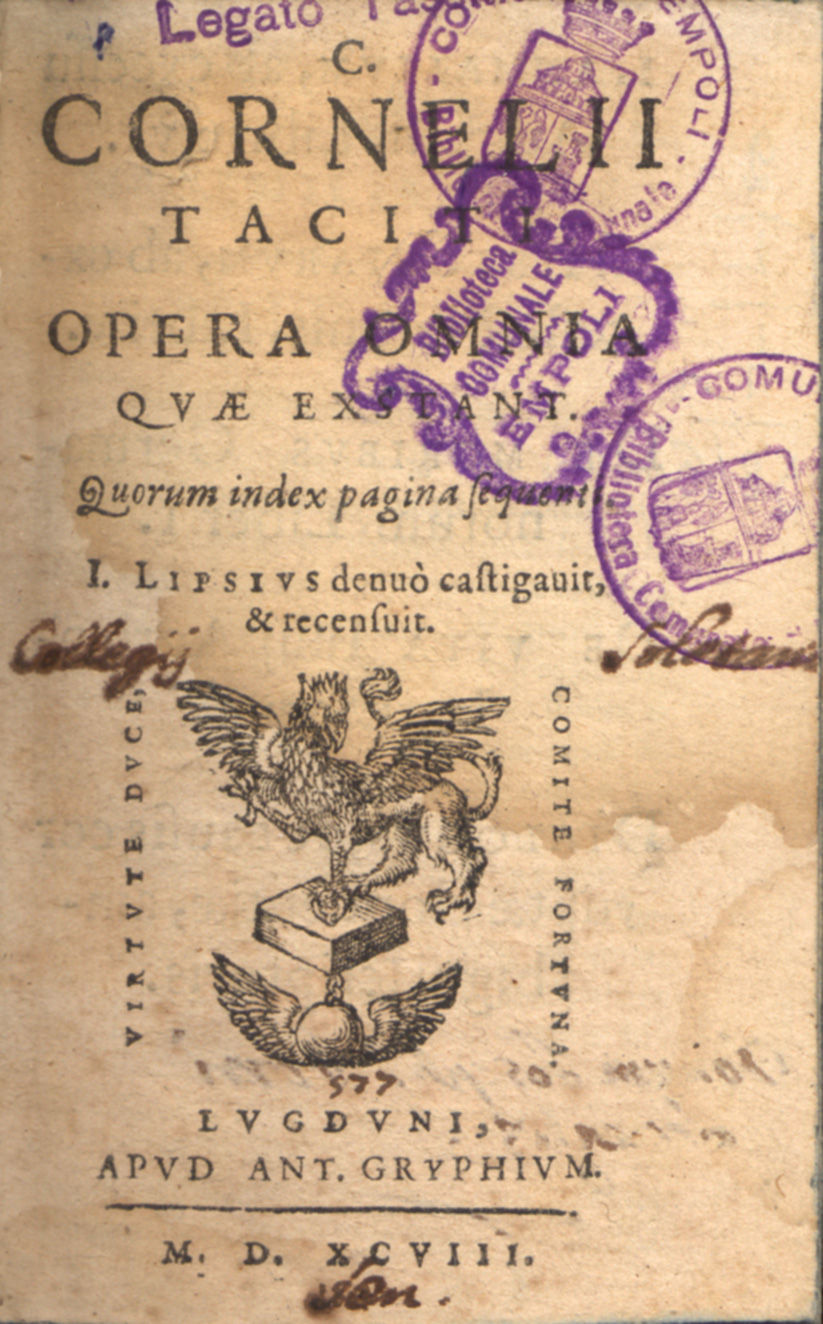
The title page of Justus Lipsius's 1598 edition of the complete works of Tacitus, bearing the stamps of the Bibliotheca Comunale in Empoli, Italy

Five works ascribed to Tacitus have survived (albeit with gaps), the most substantial of which are the Annals and the Histories. This canon (with approximate dates) consists of:

- (98) De vita Iulii Agricolae (The Life of Agricola)
- (98) De origine et situ Germanorum (Germania)
- (102) Dialogus de oratoribus (Dialogue on Oratory)
- (105) Historiae (Histories)
- (117) Ab excessu divi Augusti (Annals)

=== History of the Roman Empire from the death of Augustus ===
The Annals and the Histories, published separately, were meant to form a single edition of thirty books. Although Tacitus wrote the Histories before the Annals, the events in the Annals precede the Histories; together they form a continuous narrative from the death of Augustus (14) to the death of Domitian (96). Though most has been lost, what remains is an invaluable record of the era. The first half of the Annals survived in a single manuscript from Corvey Abbey in Germany, and the second half in a single manuscript from Monte Cassino in Italy; it is remarkable that they survived at all.

==== The Histories ====
In an early chapter of the Agricola, Tacitus asserts that he wishes to speak about the years of Domitian, Nerva and Trajan. In the Histories the scope has changed; Tacitus says that he will deal with the age of Nerva and Trajan at a later time. Instead, he will cover the period from the civil wars of the Year of the Four Emperors and end with the despotism of the Flavians. Only the first four books and twenty-six chapters of the fifth book survive, covering the year 69 and the first part of 70. The work is believed to have continued up to the death of Domitian on September 18, 96. The fifth book contains—as a prelude to the account of Titus's suppression of the First Jewish–Roman War—a short ethnographic survey of the ancient Jews, and it is an invaluable record of Roman attitudes towards them.

==== The Annals ====
The Annals, Tacitus's final work, covers the period from the death of Augustus in AD 14. He wrote at least sixteen books, but books 7–10 and parts of books 5, 6, 11, and 16 are missing. Book 6 ends with the death of Tiberius, and books 7–12 presumably covered the reigns of Caligula and Claudius. The remaining books cover the reign of Nero, perhaps until his death in June 68 or until the end of that year to connect with the Histories. The second half of book 16 is missing, ending with the events of 66. It is not known whether Tacitus completed the work; he died before he could complete his planned histories of Nerva and Trajan, and no record survives of the work on Augustus and the beginnings of the Roman Empire, with which he had planned to finish his work. The Annals is one of the earliest secular historical writings to mention Jesus of Nazareth, which Tacitus does in connection with Nero's persecution of the Christians.

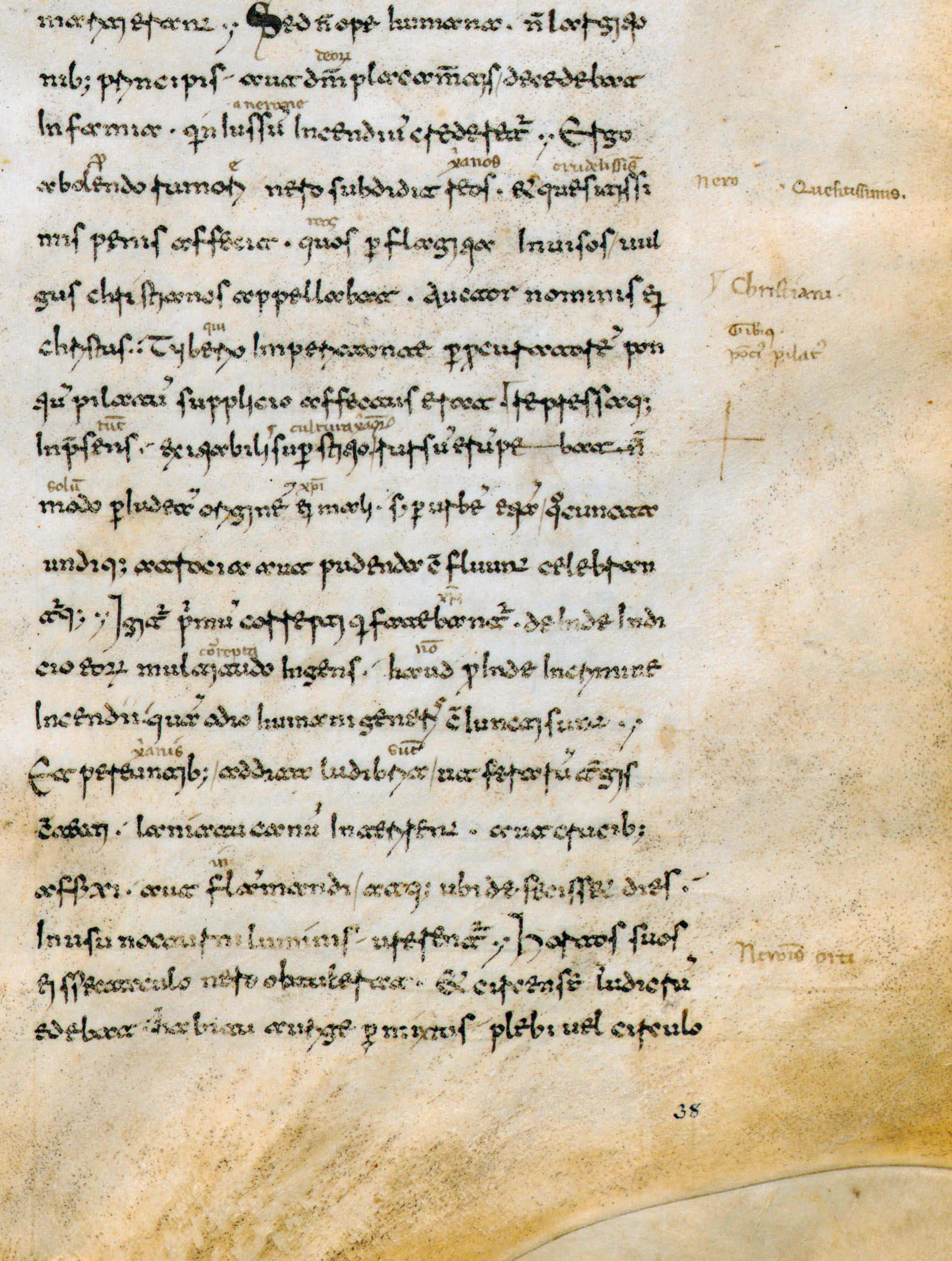
Annals 15.44, in the second Medicean manuscript

=== Monographs ===
Tacitus wrote three works with a more limited scope: Agricola, a biography of his father-in-law, Gnaeus Julius Agricola; the Germania, a monograph on the lands and tribes of barbarian Germania; and the Dialogus, a dialogue on the art of rhetoric.

==== Germania ====
The Germania (Latin title: De Origine et situ Germanorum) is an ethnographic work on the Germanic tribes outside the Roman Empire. The Germania fits within a classical ethnographic tradition which includes authors such as Herodotus and Julius Caesar. The book begins (chapters 1–27) with a description of the lands, laws, and customs of the various tribes. Later chapters focus on descriptions of particular tribes, beginning with those who lived closest to the Roman empire, and ending with a description of those who lived on the shores of the Baltic Sea, such as the Fenni. Tacitus had written a similar, albeit shorter, piece in his Agricola (chapters 10–13).

==== Agricola (De vita et moribus Iulii Agricolae) ====
The Agricola (written c. 98) recounts the life of Gnaeus Julius Agricola, an eminent Roman general and Tacitus's father-in-law; it also covers, briefly, the geography and ethnography of ancient Britain. As in the Germania, Tacitus favorably contrasts the liberty of the native Britons with the tyranny and corruption of the Empire; the book also contains eloquent polemics against the greed of Rome, one of which, that Tacitus claims is from a speech by Calgacus, ends by asserting, Auferre trucidare rapere falsis nominibus imperium, atque ubi solitudinem faciunt, pacem appellant. ("To ravage, to slaughter, to usurp under false titles, they call empire; and where they make a desert, they call it peace."—Oxford Revised Translation).

==== Dialogus ====
There is uncertainty about when Tacitus wrote Dialogus de oratoribus. Many characteristics set it apart from the other works of Tacitus, so that its authenticity has at various times been questioned. It is likely to be early work, indebted to the author's rhetorical training, since its style imitates that of the foremost Roman orator Cicero. It lacks (for example) the incongruities that are typical of his mature historical works. The Dialogus is dedicated to Fabius Iustus, a consul in 102 AD.

== Literary style ==
Tacitus's writings are known for their dense prose that seldom glosses the facts, in contrast to the style of some of his contemporaries, such as Plutarch. When he writes about a near defeat of the Roman army in Annals I,63, he does so with brevity of description rather than embellishment.

In most of his writings, he keeps to a chronological narrative order, only seldom outlining the bigger picture, leaving the readers to construct that picture for themselves. Nonetheless, where he does use broad strokes, for example, in the opening paragraphs of the Annals, he uses a few condensed phrases which take the reader to the heart of the story.

=== Approach to history ===
Tacitus's historical style owes some debt to Sallust. His historiography offers penetrating—often pessimistic—insights into the psychology of power politics, blending straightforward descriptions of events, moral lessons, and tightly focused dramatic accounts. Tacitus's own declaration regarding his approach to history (Annals I,1) is well known:

inde consilium mihi ... tradere ... sine ira et studio, quorum causas procul habeo.

my purpose is ... to relate ... without either anger or zeal, motives from which I am far removed.

There has been much scholarly discussion about Tacitus's "neutrality". Throughout his writing, he is preoccupied with the balance of power between the Senate and the emperors, and the increasing corruption of the governing classes of Rome as they adjusted to the ever-growing wealth and power of the empire. In Tacitus's view, senators squandered their cultural inheritance—that of free speech—to placate their (rarely benign) emperor.

Tacitus noted the increasing dependence of the emperor on the goodwill of his armies. The Julio-Claudians eventually gave way to generals, who followed Julius Caesar (and Sulla and Pompey) in recognizing that military might could secure them the political power in Rome. (Hist. 1.4)

Welcome as the death of Nero had been in the first burst of joy, yet it had not only roused various emotions in Rome, among the Senators, the people, or the soldiery of the capital, it had also excited all the legions and their generals; for now had been divulged that secret of the empire, that emperors could be made elsewhere than at Rome.

Tacitus's political career was largely lived out under the emperor Domitian. His experience of the tyranny, corruption, and decadence of that era (81–96) may explain the bitterness and irony of his political analysis. He draws our attention to the dangers of power without accountability, love of power untempered by principle, and the apathy and corruption engendered by the concentration of wealth generated through trade and conquest by the empire.

Nonetheless, the image he builds of Tiberius throughout the first six books of the Annals is neither exclusively bleak nor approving: most scholars view the image of Tiberius as predominantly positive in the first books, and predominantly negative after the intrigues of Sejanus. The entrance of Tiberius in the first chapters of the first book is dominated by the hypocrisy of the new emperor and his courtiers. In the later books, some respect is evident for the cleverness of the old emperor in securing his position.

In general, Tacitus does not fear to praise and to criticize the same person, often noting what he takes to be their more admirable and less admirable properties. One of Tacitus's hallmarks is refraining from conclusively taking sides for or against persons he describes, which has led some to interpret his works as both supporting and rejecting the imperial system (see Tacitean studies, Black vs. Red Tacitists).

=== Prose ===
His Latin style is highly praised. His style, although it has a grandeur and eloquence (thanks to Tacitus's education in rhetoric), is extremely concise, even epigrammatic—the sentences are rarely flowing or beautiful, but their point is always clear. The style has been both derided as "harsh, unpleasant, and thorny" and praised as "grave, concise, and pithily eloquent".

A passage of Annals 1.1, where Tacitus laments the state of the historiography regarding the last four emperors of the Julio-Claudian dynasty, illustrates his style: "The histories of Tiberius, Gaius, Claudius and Nero, while they were in power, were falsified through terror and after their death were written under the irritation of a recent hatred", or in a word-for-word translation:

Latin
Translation

Tiberiī Gāīque et Claudiī ac Nerōnis rēs
flōrentibus ipsīs—ob metum—falsae,
postquam occiderant—recentibus ōdiīs—compositae
sunt.

Tiberius's, Gaius's and Claudius's as well as Nero's acts
while flourishing themselves—out of fear—counterfeited,
after they came to fall—resulting from new-found hate—related
are.

Interpunction and line breaks added for clarity.

Compared to the Ciceronian period, where sentences were usually the length of a paragraph and artfully constructed with nested pairs of carefully matched sonorous phrases, this is short and to the point. But it is also very individual. Note the three different ways of saying and in the first line (-que, et, ac), and especially the matched second and third lines. They are parallel in sense but not in sound; the pairs of words ending "-entibus … -is" are crossed over in a way that deliberately breaks the Ciceronian conventions—which one would, however, need to be acquainted with to see the novelty of Tacitus's style. Some readers, then and now, find this teasing of their expectations merely irritating. Others find the deliberate discord, playing against the evident parallelism of the two lines, stimulating and intriguing.

His historical works focus on the motives of the characters, often with penetrating insight—though it is questionable how much of his insight is correct, and how much is convincing only because of his rhetorical skill. He is at his best when exposing hypocrisy and dissimulation; for example, he follows a narrative recounting Tiberius's refusal of the title pater patriae by recalling the institution of a law forbidding any "treasonous" speech or writings—and the frivolous prosecutions which resulted (Annals, 1.72). Elsewhere (Annals 4.64–66) he compares Tiberius's public distribution of fire relief to his failure to stop the perversions and abuses of justice which he had begun. Although this kind of insight has earned him praise, he has also been criticized for ignoring the larger context.

Tacitus owes most, both in language and in method, to Sallust, and Ammianus Marcellinus is the later historian whose work most closely approaches him in style.

== Sources ==
Tacitus makes use of the official sources of the Roman state: the Acta Senatus (the minutes of the sessions of the Senate) and the Acta Diurna (a collection of the acts of the government and news of the court and capital). He also read collections of emperors' speeches, such as those of Tiberius and Claudius.

Tacitus cites some of his sources directly, among them Cluvius Rufus, Fabius Rusticus and Pliny the Elder, who had written Bella Germaniae and a historical work which was the continuation of that of Aufidius Bassus. Tacitus also uses collections of letters (epistolarium). He also took information from exitus illustrium virorum. These were a collection of books by those who were antithetical to the emperors. They tell of sacrifices by martyrs to freedom, especially the men who committed suicide. While he places no value on the Stoic theory of suicide and views suicides as ostentatious and politically useless, Tacitus often gives prominence to speeches made by those about to commit suicide, for example Cremutius Cordus' speech in Ann. IV, 34–35.

== Influence ==
Tacitus's Histories offers insights into Roman attitudes towards Jews, descriptions of Jewish customs, and context for the First Jewish–Roman War. His Annals are of interest for providing an early account of the persecution of Christians and one of the earliest extra-Biblical references to the crucifixion of Jesus.

Edward Gibbon considered Tacitus the very model of the philosophic historian.

== Editions ==
=== Teubner ===
In 1934–36 a Teubner edition of complete works by Tacitus (P. Cornelii Taciti libri qui supersunt) edited by Erich Koestermann was published. Koestermann prepared then a second edition published in 1960–70. It is now outdated. A completely new Teubner edition (with the same title) was published in 1978–83. The most part of it (Annals, Histories and Dialogue) was edited by Heinz Heubner, with Germania edited by Alf Önnerfors and Agricola by Josef Delz. Yet another Teubner edition was prepared by István Borzsák and Kenneth Wellesley in 1986–92: Borzsák edited books I–VI of the Annals, and Wellesley books XI–XVI and the Histories. This edition remains unfinished, as the last volume containing the three minor opuscles was never issued.

=== Cambridge Classical Texts and Commentaries ===
- Goodyear, F. R. D. (1972) The Annals of Tacitus, Books 1–6. Vol. I: Annals I.1—54. Cambridge University Press.
- Goodyear, F. R. D. (1981) The Annals of Tacitus, Books 1–6. Vol. II: Annals I.55—81 and Annals II. Cambridge University Press.
- Woodman, A. J. and Martin, Ronald H. (2004) The Annals of Tacitus, Book 3. Cambridge University Press.
- Woodman, A. J. (2018) The Annals of Tacitus, Book 4. Cambridge University Press.
- Woodman, A. J. (2016) The Annals of Tacitus, Books 5–6. Cambridge University Press.
- Malloch, S. J. V. (2013) The Annals of Tacitus, Book 11. Cambridge Classical Texts and Commentaries. Cambridge University Press.

=== Cambridge Greek and Latin Classics ===
- Martin, R. H. and Woodman, A. J. (1989) Tacitus: Annals, Book IV. Cambridge University Press.
- Ash, Rhiannon (2018) Tacitus: Annals, Book XV. Cambridge University Press.
- Damon, Cynthia (2003) Tacitus: Histories Book I. Cambridge University Press.
- Ash, Rhiannon (2007) Tacitus: Histories Book II. Cambridge University Press.
- Woodman, A. J., with Kraus, C. S. (2014) Tacitus: Agricola. Cambridge University Press.
- Mayer, Roland (2001) Tacitus: Dialogus de oratoribus. Cambridge University Press.

== See also ==
- Claude Fauchet: the first person to translate all of Tacitus's works into French
- Justus Lipsius: produced an extremely influential early modern edition of Tacitus (1574)

== Bibliography ==
- Bartera, Salvador, Shannon-Henderson, Kelly E. The Oxford Critical Guide to Tacitus. (Oxford: Oxford University Press, 2025) ISBN 978-0198967583
- Benario, Herbert W. An Introduction to Tacitus. (Athens, GA: University of Georgia Press, 1975) ISBN 0-8203-0361-5
- Birley, Anthony R. (2000). "The Life and Death of Cornelius Tacitus". Historia: Zeitschrift für Alte Geschichte. 49 (2): 230–247. ISSN 0018-2311. JSTOR 4436577.
- Burke, P. "Tacitism" in Dorey, T.A., 1969, pp. 149–171
- Damon, Cynthia. "Relatio vs. Oratio: Tacitus, Ann. 3.12 and the Senatus Consultum De Cn. Pisone Patre." The Classical Quarterly, vol. 49, no. 1, (1999), pp. 336–338
- Damon, Cynthia (1999). "The Trial of Cn. Piso in Tacitus' Annals and the 'Senatus Consultum De Cn. Pisone Patre': New Light on Narrative Technique". The American Journal of Philology. 120 (1): 143–162. doi:10.1353/ajp.1999.0007. Archived from the original on July 19, 2018.
- Damon, Cynthia. Writing with Posterity in Mind: Thucydides and Tacitus on Secession. In The Oxford Handbook of Thucydides. (Oxford University Press, 2017).
- Dudley, Donald R. The World of Tacitus (London: Secker and Warburg, 1968) ISBN 0-436-13900-6
- Goodyear, F.R.D. The Annals of Tacitus, vol. 2 (Cambridge: Cambridge University Press, 1981). Commentary on Annals 1.55–81 and Annals 2.
- Gordon, Mary L. "The Patria of Tacitus". The Journal of Roman Studies, Vol. 26, Part 2 (1936), pp. 145–151.
- Martin, Ronald. Tacitus (London: Batsford, 1981)
- Mellor, Ronald. Tacitus (New York / London: Routledge, 1993) ISBN 0-415-90665-2, 0415910021, 978-0415910026
- Mellor, Ronald. Tacitus' Annals (Oxford/New York: Oxford University Press, 2010) (Oxford Approaches to Classical Literature) ISBN 0198034679, 978-0198034674
- Mellor, Ronald (ed.). Tacitus: The Classical Heritage (New York: Garland Publishing, 1995) ISBN 0-8153-0933-3, 978-0815309338
- Mendell, Clarence. Tacitus: The Man and His Work. (New Haven: Yale University Press, 1957) ISBN 0-208-00818-7
- Oliver, Revilo P. "The First Medicean MS of Tacitus and the Titulature of Ancient Books". Transactions and Proceedings of the American Philological Association, Vol. 82 (1951), pp. 232–261.
- Oliver, Revilo P. "The Praenomen of Tacitus". The American Journal of Philology, Vol. 98, No. 1 (Spring, 1977), pp. 64–70.
- Ostler, Nicholas. Ad Infinitum: A Biography of Latin. HarperCollins in the UK, and Walker & Co. in the US: London and New York, 2007. ISBN 978-0-00-734306-5; 2009 edition: ISBN 080271840X, 978-0802718402 – 2010 e-book: ISBN 0007364881, 978-0007364886
- Pagán, Victoria Emma (2023). The Tacitus encyclopedia. Hoboken, NJ: Wiley Blackwell. ISBN 9781444350258.
- Syme, Ronald. Tacitus, Volumes 1 and 2. (Oxford: Oxford University Press, 1958) (reprinted in 1985 by the same publisher, with the ISBN 0-19-814327-3) is the definitive study of his life and works.
- ten Berge, Bram L.H. (2023). Writing imperial history: Tacitus from Agricola to Annales. Ann Arbor: University of Michigan Press. ISBN 9780472133437.
- Taylor, John W. Tacitus and the Boudican Revolt. (Dublin, Ireland: Camuvlos, 1998)

Political offices
Preceded by Quintus Glitius Atilius Agricola, and Lucius Pomponius Maternus as Suffect consuls	Suffect consul of the Roman Empire; 97 with Marcus Ostorius Scapula	Succeeded by Nerva IV, and Trajan II as Ordinary consuls
