= Vassie D. Wright =

Entrepreneur, pharmacist, civic worker, civil rights activist (1870–1957)

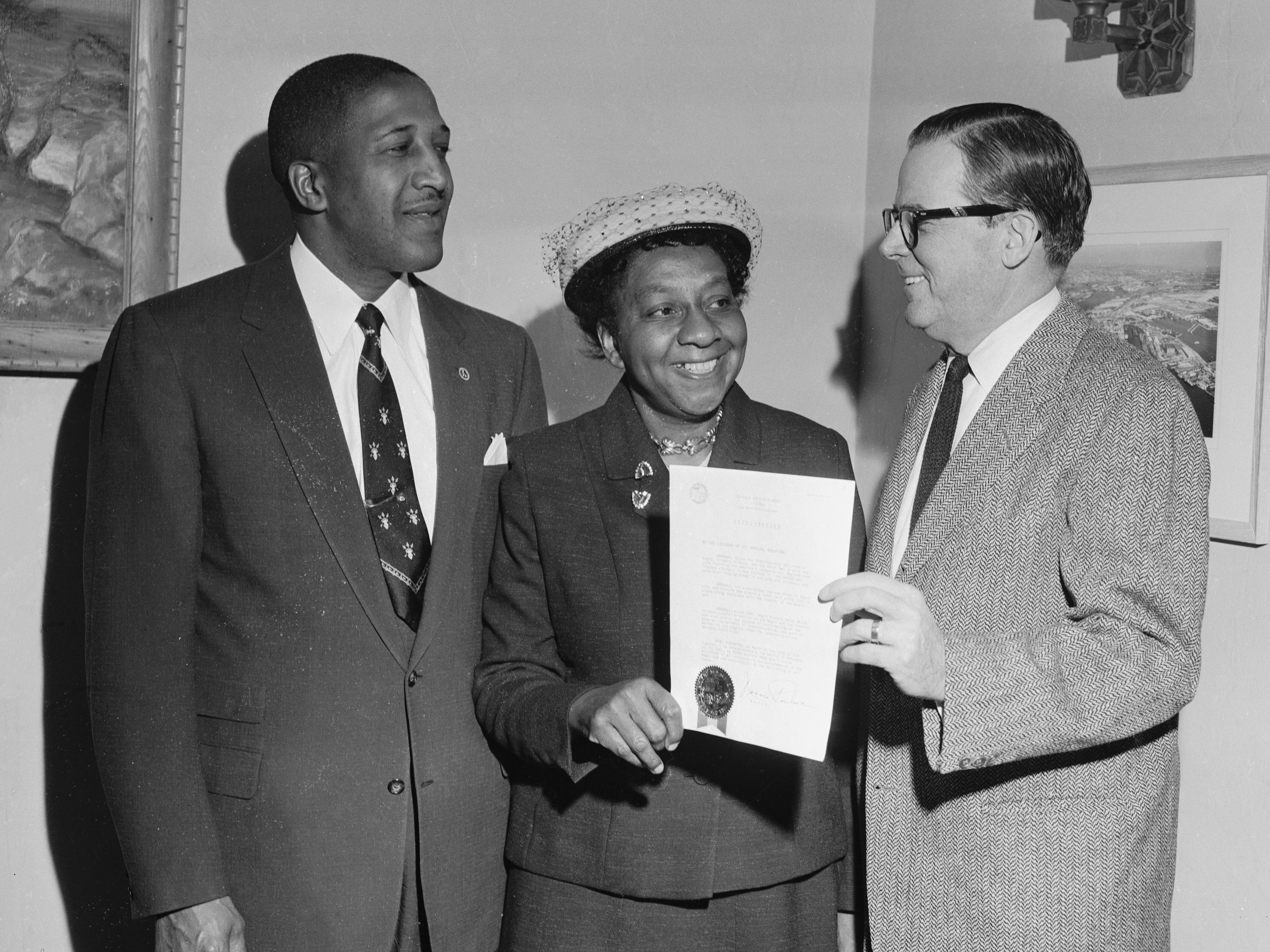
- Wright receiving Negro History Week proclamation from Mayor Norris Poulson, 1956.
- Born: Vassie Davis; 1899
- Died: 1983
- Occupation: Real Estate broker
- Organization: NAACP

Vassie Davis Wright (1899–1983) was an African-American organization founder, civic leader, real estate broker and community activist.

== Civic engagement and community activism ==
Wright served as first vice president of the Los Angeles branch of the NAACP. Wright and a group of Terminal Annex postal employees formed the Our Authors Study Club (OASC) on February 14, 1945 to study Black authors and their work. In June 1945, Carter G. Woodson chartered the group to become members of the Los Angeles branch of his Association for the Study of African American Life and History. In 1949, the Study Club held the first citywide celebration of Negro History Week in Los Angeles. Wright helped initiate a Black History curriculum in the Los Angeles Unified School District's Dorsey and Manual Arts Adult Schools. She was honored by the city of Los Angeles and then-Mayor Tom Bradley presented an award to her shortly before her death for her role in promoting the study of Black history in Southern California.

On February 6, 1956, Wright joined Dr. Leroy Weeks, Chairman of Negro History Week and mayor Norris Poulson for a Negro History Week proclamation. On February 12, 1966, Wright joined Mrs. Leontyne King, library commissioner, Jesse Overstreet and mayor Sam Yorty for a proclamation designating Feb. 12–20 as Negro History Week.

== Death and legacy ==
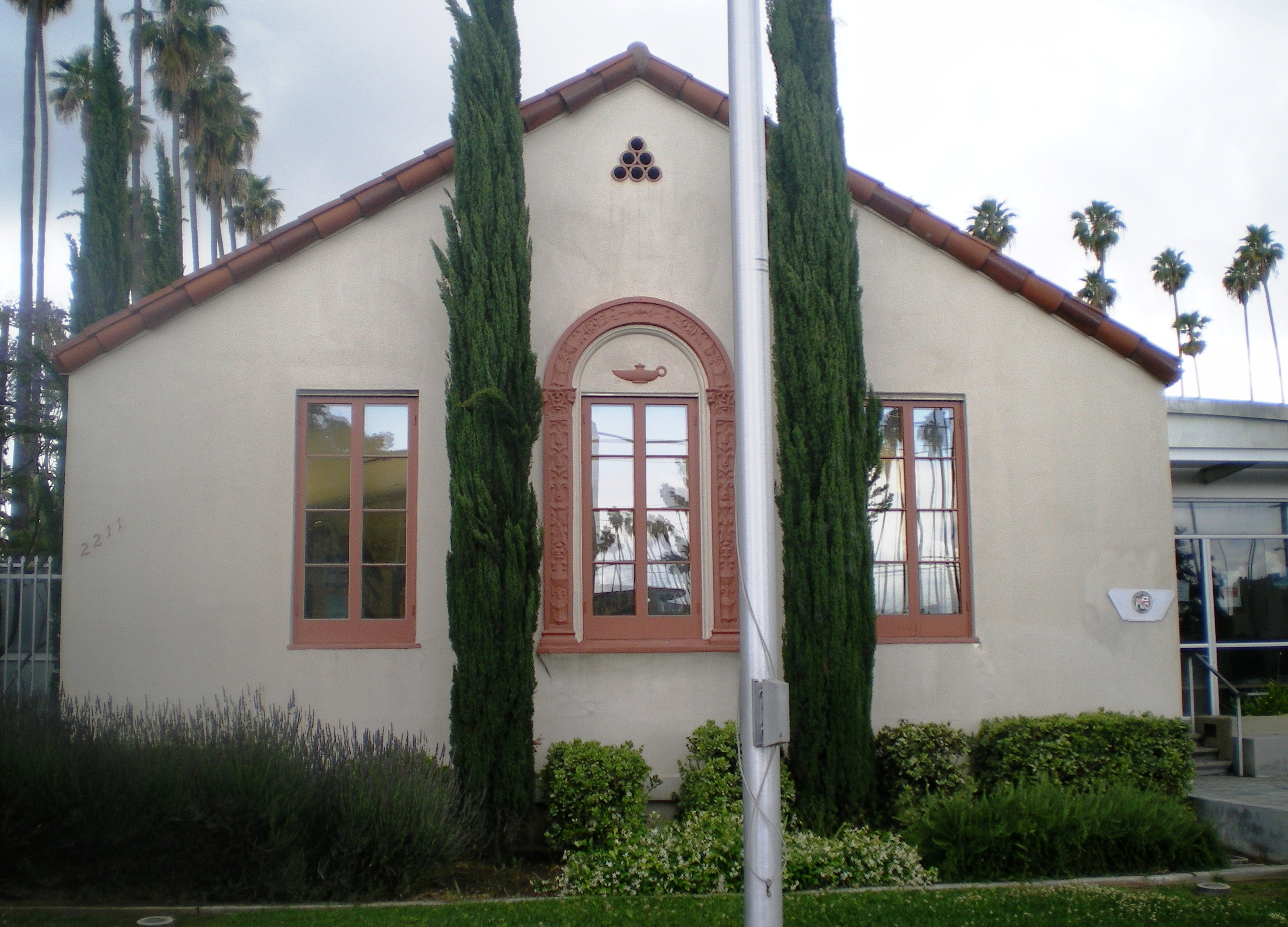
Jefferson Branch Library, Los Angeles, California, renamed in honor of Vassie D. Wright in 1985.

Before her death in 1983, Wright was recognized, along with activist Marnesba Tackett at an Los Angeles County Library event.

On February 14, 1985, the Jefferson Branch Library Los Angeles was named in her honor. The recognition took place during the administration of Tom Bradley (mayor), the first African-American mayor of Los Angeles.

Our Authors Study Club continues operation as of 2026.
