= Murray Klein =

American businessman (1923–2007)

Murray Klein (March 25, 1923 – December 6, 2007) was a Jewish American entrepreneur who helped transform New York City's famous Zabar's speciality food emporium from a small Jewish delicatessen based on Manhattan's Upper West Side into one of the city's premier culinary destinations. Klein was a part owner of Zabar's for more than 30 years before his retirement in 1994. Though not a member of the Zabar's family, Klein is credited with making many of the decisions concerning publicity, product pricing and speciality merchandise.

== Early life ==
Klein, whose birthname was Mordecai Klein, was born in 1923 in a shtetl in southwest Ukraine, which at the time was part of the Soviet Union, near the border with Romania. Klein was away at a trade school at the time of the Nazi invasion of the Soviet Union. His parents and five siblings, were captured and killed in Nazi concentration camps during World War II.

Klein was later sent to a Soviet labour camp, or gulag, by his own country for part of the war. He managed to escape the camp and joined the Irgun, which was a Jewish guerrilla movement active in the Middle East. He helped smuggle arms to the part of Palestine which later became known as Israel during his time as a member of Irgun.

Klein was captured and held as a political prisoner in Italy. He was released following a hunger strike and settled in a displaced persons camp at the Cinecittà film studios in Rome in 1945. He set up a successful bread business while living at the camp. Klein remained at the camp at Cinecittà for five years before emigrating to New York City in 1950.

== Zabar's ==
Murray Klein was first hired by Zabar's as a stock clerk and floor sweeper in 1953. The business had been founded by Louis Zabar, whose family was also Ukrainian Jewish, during the 1930s.

Klein had an unpredictable relationship with the Zabar family during the 1950s. He quit Zabar's on several occasions during those early years at the store, which even led to litigation. However, Klein returned to Zabar's in 1960, this time in a full partnership with the Zabar family. Zabar's, which had been a chain of stores, had been reduced to the single flagship store at West 80th Street and Broadway on the Upper West Side by this time.

Klein, who was in charge of pricing and speciality products, oversaw much of the recovery and expansion of Zabar's over the next couple of decades. He continued to sell Zabar's famous lines of Eastern European and Jewish specialities, such as pastrami, lox, bagels and smoked fish to appeal to Zabar's core and most loyal Jewish clientele. However, Klein also actively broadened Zabar's product offerings to appeal to Manhattanites who were increasingly looking for more sophisticated foods as part of the so-called "food revolution".

Klein often initially sold these new gourmet foods, such as white truffles, at a loss in order to attract new customers. This was, perhaps, one of the first major instances that the concept of loss leader was introduced into the gourmet food market.

Klein also began selling housewares, such as food processors, at Zabar's, which were often priced well below the average market rate In another instance, Klein began hanging kitchen utensils and other food instruments, from the store's ceiling, all of which Zabar's offered for sale.

Perhaps most importantly, however, Zabar's, under Klein's guidance and introduction, became one of the first stores in the industry to begin selling high quality, luxury foods, such as coffee, preserves and French cheese, under Zabar's own private store brand labels. These products were priced much more cheaply under the Zabar's brand name than could be found at other competing stores. Klein would look to buy luxury products directly from the producer in large volumes, and thus was able to sell more cheaply at Zabar's. In doing so, luxury products that were previously financially inaccessible to most consumers were suddenly affordable. In turn, customers were more likely to engage in more impulse buying while visiting Zabar's. Klein's ideas for selling luxury products cheaply led the way for the rest of the industry. Today, stores such as Trader Joe's, Wegmans and even Whole Foods Markets, employ Klein's same ideas to market and sell their own store brand, luxury products.

By the mid-1970s Zabar's had gained not only fame within New York City, but had also developed a national following, with much of the credit for Zabar's popularity and success going to Klein.

=== "Caviar Wars": Zabar's vs. Macy's ===
Klein was notoriously competitive when it came to selection and pricing, going so far as to posting caricatures of his main competitors in Zabar's store windows. Perhaps his most famous price and public relations dispute occurred in the months leading to Christmas 1983 between Klein and Macy's Department Store concerning the price of several high end items sold by both stores. The dispute initially began over the price of Pommery mustard, and then extended to Lindt & Sprüngli chocolate bars, before Klein and Macy's began battling each other over the cost of Beluga caviar as the holiday season crept closer. The ensuing price battle was dubbed the "Beluga caviar war" by the New York City media. Macy's initially went after Zabar's by placing a 14-ounce box of Beluga caviar on sale for US$149. Klein quickly, and happily, lowered Zabar's own price of the Beluga roe in order to undercut Macy's sales, which forced Macy's to lower its own cost to US$129, which was considered a bargain in the caviar market. Not to be outdone, Klein again lowered the Beluga price to just US$119 for a 14oz box and sold the product at a loss rather than lose to Macy's. He correctly anticipated that the ensuing positive publicity and public relations for Zabar's over the dispute would more than make up for the negative loss of selling the caviar for such a low price. Thus Klein was able to beat Macy's in terms of sales and public relations.

Klein clearly enjoyed the dispute with Macy's, especially its free publicity for Zabar's. He told the New York Times at the time of 1983 price battle, "Blood will run in the streets."

== Retirement ==
Murray Klein officially retired from Zabar's in 1994, reportedly as a millionaire. At the time of his retirement, Zabar's was making over $40 million in sales per year. Still, there was a dispute between Klein and Saul and Stanley Zabar over the financial terms of Klein's retirement, which even led to one lawsuit, before the conflict was ended. Klein and the Zabar brothers, Saul and Stanley, had worked closely at Zabar's for decades, though the relationship between the partners (Klein and the Zabars) could be complicated and confrontational at times.

== Death ==
Klein died in Manhattan of lung cancer on December 6, 2007, at the age of 84. He was survived by his wife, Edith and his son Dr. Roger Klein, and daughter Deborah Himmelfarb and six grandchildren.

Despite their sometimes turbulent relationship, Stanley Zabar praised Klein saying, "What Murray brought was the conviction that the whole world must know about Zabar’s."
