= Jefferson Branch Library, Los Angeles =

- Jefferson Branch
- U.S. National Register of Historic Places
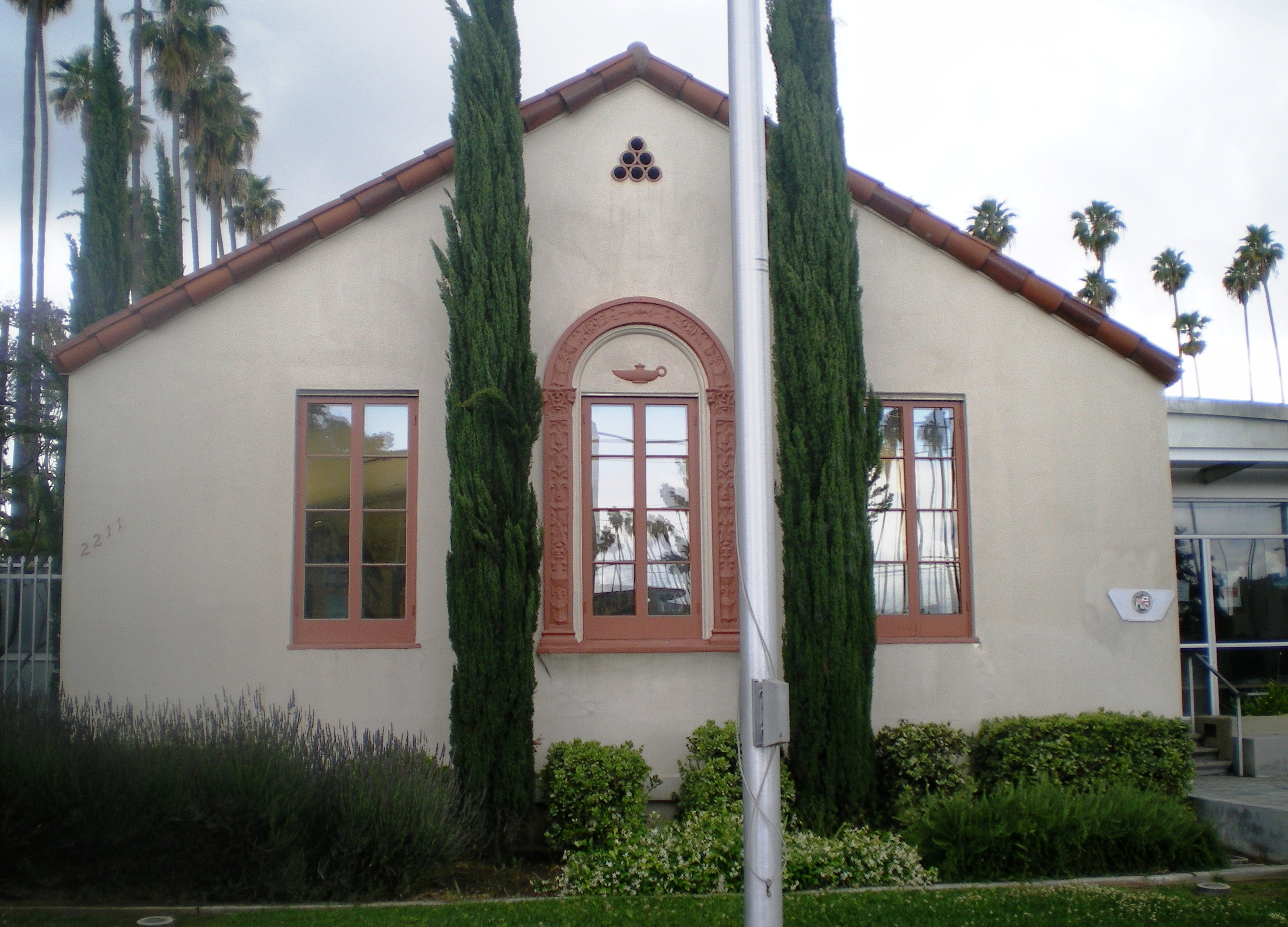
- Jefferson Branch, 2008

- Location within the Los Angeles metropolitan area Location within California Location within the United States
- Location: 2211 W. Jefferson Blvd., Los Angeles, California
- Coordinates: 34°1′20″N 118°18′59″W
- Built: 1923
- Architect: Noerenberg, C.E.
- Architectural style: Mission-Spanish Colonial Revival
- MPS: Los Angeles Branch Library System
- NRHP reference No.: 87001012
- Added to NRHP: May 19, 1987

Jefferson - Vassie D. Wright Memorial Branch Library is a branch library of the Los Angeles Public Library in the Jefferson Park neighborhood of Los Angeles, California. It was built in 1923 based on a Spanish Colonial Revival design by architect C.E. Noerenberg. It was renamed to honor Vassie D. Wright in 1985.

In 1987, the Jefferson Branch and several other branch libraries in Los Angeles were added to the National Register of Historic Places as part of a thematic group submission.

== See also ==
- List of Registered Historic Places in Los Angeles
- Los Angeles Public Library
