= Thoreau (disambiguation) =

Henry David Thoreau (1817–1862) was an American author, naturalist, transcendentalist, tax resister, development critic, and philosopher.

Thoreau may also refer to:

- Thoreau, New Mexico, United States
- Thoreau: A Sublime Life, a 2012 comic book about the philosopher
- Thoreau MacDonald (1901–1989), Canadian illustrator, designer and painter
- H. D. Thoreau, Jr. (1923–2007), track and field authority

== See also ==
- 44597 Thoreau, a minor planet
- Thoreau Society
- Mélissa Theuriau (born 1978), French journalist
