= Dmitry Grigorieff =

Dean of Saint Nicholas Russian Orthodox Cathedral

Archpriest Dmitry Grigorieff (May 14, 1919 – December 8, 2007) was the dean emeritus of the Saint Nicholas Russian Orthodox Cathedral of Washington D.C. Grigorieff was also an academic scholar and was a retired Professor of Russian language and literature at Georgetown University.

== Early life ==
Dmitry Grigorieff was born in London in 1919. His father, Dmitry Dmitrievich Grigorieff, was the governor of Sakhalin and also served on the Central Board of the Russian Red Cross. The family had fled Russia in 1918 during the Russian Revolution. They first fled to Riga, Latvia, and then to London, where Grigorieff was born.

The Grigorieffs moved to Japan in the early 1920s. Dmitry Grigorieff was baptized at St. Nicholas Church in Tokyo. The family returned to Riga after the end of the Russian Civil War where Grigorieff began studying at the Orthodox Theological Institute.

Dmitry Grigorieff, who was a British citizen, left Riga and moved to Australia during World War II. He served in the British Merchant Marines in the Pacific from 1943 to 1944. He moved to New York City in 1945, where he worked in the British Office of War Information.

Grigorieff earned a master's degree in linguistics and comparative literature from Yale University in 1948. He later received a doctorate in Slavic studies from the University of Pennsylvania in Philadelphia in 1958 and a diploma in theology from St. Vladimir's Orthodox Theological Seminary in New York City.

== Academic career ==
Grigorieff, who was a Fyodor Dostoevsky scholar, taught Russian language and literature at Georgetown University from 1959 until 1989. Additionally, he also taught at the Army Language School in Monterey, California, as a Russian language professor and at Columbia University in Manhattan.

== Priesthood ==
Grigorieff was formally ordained a Russian Orthodox priest at St. Nicholas Cathedral in Washington D.C. in 1969 at the age of 50. He was designated as the cathedral's second priest at the time. He introduced English language services to the cathedral during the 1970s and was appointed dean in 1986. Grigorieff was given the title of dean emeritus in 1998.

He continued to publish books, in both English and Russian, on the topics of linguistics and religion. His most recent work was "Dostoevsky and the Church," which was published in 2002 in Moscow.

Grigorieff was awarded the Order of St. Innocent by Patriarch Aleksy II of the Russian Orthodox Church of Moscow. This marked the first time that the order had been awarded to a priest in the United States.

== Death ==
Father Dmitry Grigorieff died of cardiac arrest on December 8, 2007, at Sibley Memorial Hospital in Washington D.C. at the age of 89. His wife, Galina Grigorieff, had died in 1998. Father Grigorieff was a resident of Bethesda, Maryland.
