= Vernon Morris =

Welsh cricketer

Personal information
- Full name: Vernon Leslie Morris
- Born: 13 June 1894; Briton Ferry, Glamorgan
- Died: 11 January 1973 (aged 78); Exmouth, Devon
- Batting: Right-handed
- Bowling: Right-arm medium
- Relatives: Robert Morris (son)

Domestic team information
- Years: Team
- 1920–1929: Glamorgan

Career statistics
Competition	First-class
Matches	18
Runs scored	407
Batting average	12.71
100s/50s	0/0
Top score	42
Catches/stumpings	9/–
- Source: Cricinfo, 26 June 2010

Vernon Leslie Morris (13 June 1900 – 11 January 1973) was a Welsh cricketer. Morris was a right-handed batsman who bowled right-arm medium pace. Morris was born at Briton Ferry, Glamorgan.

Morris made his debut for Glamorgan in the 1920 Minor Counties Championship against Wiltshire. With Glamorgan's elevation to first-class status, he made his first-class debut against Worcestershire in 1921. From 1921 to 1929, he represented Glamorgan in 18 first-class matches, with his final match for the county coming against the touring South Africans. In his 18 first-class matches, he scored 407 runs at a batting average of 12.71, with a high score of 42. In the field he took 9 catches.

Morris died at Exmouth, Devon on 11 January 1973. His son Robert Morris played first-class cricket for Cambridge University and Kent.
