= Theroux =

Theroux (French: Théroux [teʁu]) is a French surname. Notable people with the surname include:

- Alexander Theroux (born 1939), American novelist, poet and essayist
- Gary Theroux, American radio personality, author and musicologist
- Justin Theroux (born 1971), American actor and screenwriter
- Louis Theroux (born 1970), British-American broadcaster
- Marcel Theroux (born 1968), British novelist and broadcaster
- Paul Theroux (born 1941), American travel writer and novelist
- Peter Theroux (born 1956), American translator and writer

== See also ==
- Terroux (disambiguation)
- Thoreau (disambiguation)
