= Fabius Rusticus =

1st century Roman historian

Fabius Rusticus was a Roman historian who was quoted on several occasions by Tacitus. Tacitus couples his name with that of Livy and describes him as "the most graphic among ancient and modern historians." Tacitus also said that he embellished matters with his eloquence. Fabius Rusticus is described by Tacitus as a close friend of Seneca who was inclined to praise him in his work.

Fabius Rusticus was a contemporary of Claudius and Nero, but little is known of the extent of his work except that it related to events during the reign of Nero. Fabius Rusticus was one of the primary sources for Tacitus' Annals and probably for other later historians like Suetonius and Josephus as well.

Tacitus cites Fabius Rusticus when describing some of the most controversial aspects of Nero's life including Nero's alleged desire to kill his mother Agrippina the Younger, Nero's alleged lust for his mother, and Seneca's suicide.
