= Lillian Zabar =

American entrepreneur

- Louis and Lillian Zabar
- Born: Leika Teitelbaum; 1905; Ostropil, Russian Empire (now Ukraine)
- Died: 22 December 1995 (aged 89–90); New York City, U.S.
- Other name: Lilly Zabar
- Spouses: Louis Zabar (m. 1927; died 1950) Louis Chartoff (m. 1950; died 1978)
- Children: 3, including Saul
- Parent: Gershon Teitelbaum (Father) Sheindel Teitelbaum (Mother)
- Relatives: Mottel Teitelbaum (brother)

Lillian Zabar (/ˈzeɪ.bɑːr/ ZAY-bar) (born Leika Teitelbaum; c. 1905 – 22 December 1995) was an American entrepreneur and co-founder of Zabar's delicatessen.

== Biography ==
Lillian Zabar was born Leika Teitelbaum around 1905 in the Russian Empire. She claimed it was her 90th birthday the day she died but all that is known is that she was born at Hanukkah but not exactly which year. As was tradition among Ashkenazi Jews, a child's birth was celebrated on the nearest holiday, and not the day they were born. In the 1920s, she arrived in the United States, fleeing the persecution of Jews in Ukraine. She initially fled to Warsaw, where, after being helped out by HIAS, she was able to depart from Danzig for Boston. She said she was younger than she was to prevent any chance of being rejected as too old. She initially lived in Philadelphia before moving to New York. Louis Zabar was from the same village as Lillian. Zabar was a talented cook, while her husband was interested in deli food. She specialized in potato salad and coleslaw, as well as the popular blintzes, and they opened their first delicatessen in 1934 in Brooklyn before later moving to Manhattan. The couple had three children; Saul, Stanley, and Eli.
