= Jim Nevill =

James Francis Nevill QPM (20 February 1927 – 12 December 2007) was the head of the Scotland Yard Bomb Squad. He was Detective Chief Superintendent in 1975 at the height of a Provisional Irish Republican Army bombing campaign in London, the police cornered four IRA gunmen in a flat in Balcombe Street where they took a middle aged couple hostage. The siege lasted for six days, Nevill was in charge of the negotiations. He also took part in the investigation of the Great Train Robbery in 1963. He was later promoted to commander. He died on 12 December 2007.

He served in World War II in the Royal Fusiliers.
