= Reinhard Heß =

German ski jumping coach

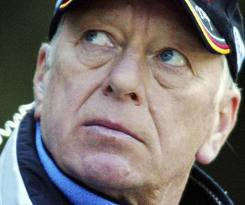
Reinhard Heß

Reinhard Heß (13 June 1945 – 24 December 2007) was a German ski jumping coach. He was the national team's coach from 1993 until 2003, helping the sport in becoming popular in Germany.

Heß was born in Lauscha, Thuringia. The jumpers he trained included Martin Schmitt, who won the world cup two times and Sven Hannawald, who won the Four Hills Tournament in 2002. With 21 medals won in world championships and Olympic Games combined, Heß was Germany's most successful ski jumping coach. He died of pancreatic cancer in Bad Berka.
