= Mike Donkin =

English reporter and journalist (1951–2007)

Michael Charles Donkin (29 August 1951 – 6 December 2007) was an English reporter and journalist for BBC News.

Donkin was born in Southend-on-Sea, Essex in 1951. He went to school at the Northern Grammar School for Boys, in North End, Portsmouth. He landed his first job with the East Anglian Daily Times in Ipswich. In 1975, he joined the BBC as a freelancer. Shortly after he joined The Today Programme on BBC Radio 4, he was praised for good work and quickly progressed to television. He worked on both the 6 O'clock and 10 O'clock news as a world affairs correspondent. During his time with the BBC, Donkin made several short 5 to 6 minute films. He was most pleased with the film about a bed and breakfast farm. One year after Donkin started with the BBC, he married his wife Catriona. They had three daughters and one son together.

Donkin had a short battle with cancer. On 6 December 2007 he died from the illness.
