= José Luis Calva =

Mexican writer, murderer, and suspected serial killer (1969–2007)

- Born: Luis Calva Zepeda; June 20, 1969; Mexico City, Mexico
- Died: December 11, 2007 (aged 38)
- Cause of death: Suicide by hanging
- Convictions: Murder, cannibalism

Details
- Victims: 1–3+
- Country: Mexico
- State: Mexican Federal District
- Date apprehended: October 2007

José Luis Calva (June 20, 1969 – December 11, 2007) was a Mexican writer, murderer, and suspected serial killer. He was charged with murdering and consuming his girlfriend in 2007, to which he confessed before killing himself pre-trial, and was suspected in at least two other murders.

== Biography ==
=== Early life ===
Calva's childhood was traumatic. His father died when he was two, and his mother used to bring men to his home whom the boy had to call "dad". When he was seven, he was raped by a 16-year-old friend of his older brother.

He met the woman who would become his wife and mother of two of his children, Aide, in 1996. They divorced and she moved to the United States with their daughters. He sank into a deep depression.

=== Arrest ===
In October 2007, forces of the Federal Preventive Police went to Calva's home to arrest him under the suspicion that he was responsible for the disappearance of his girlfriend Alejandra Galeana, who was last seen on October 6. He was found eating a dish of human meat seasoned with lemon. He tried to escape by jumping through the window, severely injuring himself, but was captured.

Inside his flat, the police found the mutilated body of his girlfriend, human meat in the refrigerator, a frying pan with cooked human flesh and human bones in a box of cereal. Aside from that, an unfinished book titled Instintos Caníbales or 12 días (Cannibal Instincts or 12 days) and a picture of Anthony Hopkins portraying Hannibal Lecter was also found.

=== Death ===
On the early morning of December 11, 2007, Calva, who apparently had committed suicide between 6:00 and 6:30 a.m., was found hanging by his belt from the roof of his holding cell. No suicide note was found.

== See also ==
- List of incidents of cannibalism
- List of serial killers by country
