= Willie Robinson (singer) =

American singer

William Lorenzo Robinson (July 6, 1926 – December 30, 2007), known as "Weepin'" Willie Robinson or "Weep" Robinson, was an American blues singer who began his career in the 1950s, and performed with, among others, Susan Tedeschi, Steven Tyler and Bonnie Raitt.

Robinson was born in Atlanta, Georgia, United States. Robinson had been a sharecropper, a soldier and a boxer. A steady position as an emcee/comedian at a Trenton, New Jersey nightclub led to his singing career. He eventually sang with B.B. King's 21-piece orchestra. He and King became friends.

Robinson settled in Boston, Massachusetts, in 1959 and played in clubs, but by 2004 he was homeless. Musicians and other concerned individuals, when they learned of Robinson's situation, held a benefit concert on his behalf, making sure he was fed and clothed.

He died, aged 81, from a fire accidentally started by a cigarette he had been smoking in bed at his home in Jamaica Plain, Boston. His wife, Alice, long predeceased him. He was survived by a daughter.
