= Schuster Vance =

American actor

- Born: September 21, 1960
- Died: December 12, 2007 (aged 47); Baltimore, Maryland

Schuster Vance (September 21, 1960 – December 12, 2007) was an American television and film actor. His birth name was Henry Schuster Vance III. In addition to his roles as a supporting actor in a number of films and television shows, Vance was also a member of the East Coast chapter of the Becker's Precision Driving Professionals team, who perform for television and movie productions. He was a member of the Screen Actors Guild.

Vance died on December 12, 2007, at the Gilchrist Hospice in Baltimore, Maryland, at the age of 47. He had been suddenly diagnosed with cancer just a week before his death. His funeral was held at the Christ Lutheran Church of Bethesda, Maryland.
