= Victor Navarra =

American firefighter

Victor J. Navarra (June 29, 1952 - December 30, 2007) was a New York City Fire Department lieutenant who coordinated the start of 26 consecutive New York City Marathon.

== Early life and career ==
Navarra was born on June 29, 1952, and, as a teenager, joined the Staten Island Athletic Club. In 1976 he performed volunteer work for the marathon. He spent 21 years in the Fire Department, 10 of those as a lieutenant with Ladder Company 35 at 66th Street and Amsterdam Avenue in Manhattan. He retired in 1997, but he volunteered at the firehouse and participated in the search for survivors at the World Trade Center site after the attacks of September 11, 2001.

== Marathon work ==
In 1982 he officially started to coordinate the start of the race. He held the position for the last 26 marathons. Coordinating the few hours before the event, between the time the Verrazzano–Narrows Bridge is closed to traffic and the start of the race, typically takes a year of planning.

He also helped organize marathons throughout the country. He was credited with devising the now-standard system for kicking off a major marathon.

On the 2007 New York Marathon Navarra sat next to the starting line as his wife and daughter took care of his duties.

== Death ==
On the 30 December 2007 Navarra died at age 55. The cause was cancer of the sinus, which was diagnosed in 2005. He attributed his cancer to airborne toxins present at the site of the World Trade Center when he helped with the search. He is survived by his wife and two adult daughters.
