= Henrietta Yurchenco =

- Born: Henrietta Weiss; March 22, 1916; New Haven, Connecticut, United States
- Died: December 10, 2007 (aged 91) New York City, New York, United States
- Occupation: Ethnomusicologist

Henrietta Yurchenco (born Henrietta Weiss; March 22, 1916 – December 10, 2007) was an American ethnomusicologist, folklorist, radio producer, and radio host. She worked to save traditional music by recording in Guatemala, Mexico, the United States, and Morocco.

== Biography and career ==
She was born Henrietta Weiss in New Haven, Connecticut, March 22, 1916.

Yurchenco studied piano at Yale University in the School of Music. She recorded traditional music in Guatemala, Mexico, the United States, and Morocco. She also worked at WNYC radio station and taught at the City College of New York.

She knew Alan Lomax and Pete Seeger. She hosted Woody Guthrie on her WNYC radio show, Adventures in Music, in 1940.

She lived in New York City, New York, and died there on December 10, 2007, from lung failure, at the age of 91.

== Personal life ==
She had been married the Argentine-born painter Basil Yurchenco. The couple divorced in 1955.

== Books ==
- Yurchenco, Henrietta (2002). Around the World in 80 Years: A Memoir--A Musical Odyssey by Henrietta Yurchenco. Point Richmond, California: MRI Press.
- Yurchenco, Henrietta, assisted by Marjorie Guthrie. A Mighty Hard Road: The Woody Guthrie Story. Introduction by Arlo Guthrie.
- Yurchenco, Henrietta. In Their Own Voices: Women in the Judeo-Hispanic Song and Story.
- Yurchenco, Henrietta. A Russian Song Book.
- Yurchenco, Henrietta. Hablamos!
- Yurchenco, Henrietta. In Their Own Voices. (About the music of Sephardic Jewish women in Morocco, as well as numerous articles on folk music and figures, including Dylan, Bessie Smith, and Aunt Molly Jackson; as yet unpublished.)

Yurchenco was interviewed by Mickey Hart of the Grateful Dead and is featured in his book Songcatchers, published by National Geographic.

== Films ==
- 1996 - Henrietta Yurchenco: testimonio de vida. Directed by José Luis Sagredo.
- 2004 - Lomax the Songhunter. Directed by Rogier Kappers.
- 2005 - This Machine Kills Fascists. Directed by Stephen Gammond.
