= Heloneida Studart =

Brazilian writer, advocate, politician (1932–2007)

- Born: April 25, 1932
- Died: December 3, 2007 (aged 75); Rio de Janeiro
- Writing career
- Subject: Feminism

Heloneida Studart (April 25, 1932 – December 3, 2007) was a Brazilian writer, essayist, playwright, journalist, advocate for women's rights, and political figure. She was awarded the prize Orlando Dantas

== Biography ==
Heloneida Studart was born in Fortaleza, April 25, 1932. Her parents were Edite Studart and Vicente Soares. On her mother's side, she was related to Guilherme Studart, barão de Studart. On her father's side, she descends from the geographer, Antonio Bezerra de Menezes. At the age of nine, while studying at the Imaculada Conceição de Fortaleza school, she wrote a children's story entitled A Menina Que fugiu do Frio ("The girl who fled the cold"), and it is said that her writing career began after that. By the age of sixteen, she was living in Rio de Janeiro, and working as a columnist for the newspaper O Nordeste. Despite having a degree in Social Sciences from the University of Brazil, she worked as a journalist for decade as well as ten years as editor of Manchete magazine. She married Franz Orban; they had six children. Studart was elected six times as Deputy of the state of Rio de Janeiro, by the Workers Party. In 1966, she was elected president of Sindicato das Entidades Culturais (Senambra). With other women, she founded the Center of Brazilian Women, which was Brazil's first feminist organization; and the State Center for Women's Rights. In 2005, she was included in the collective initiative of "1,000 Women" for the Nobel Peace Prize, under the auspices of the Swiss organization Women for Peace around the World, which sought recognition of the role of women in peace efforts. She was awarded the prize Orlando Dantas. Studart died in Rio de Janeiro, December 3, 2007.
