= George Paraskevaides =

Cypriot philanthropist and businessman

George Paraskevaides (1916 – December 5, 2007) was a Cypriot philanthropist and businessman who focused on the construction business in Europe and the Middle East. Paraskevaides was one of the co-founders of Joannou & Paraskevaides (ceased operations 2018) with fellow Cypriot, Stelios Ioannou.

== Early life ==
Paraskevaides was born in Athens, Greece, in 1916. His family moved to Cyprus when he was very young. He studied architecture at Politecnico di Milano in Milan, Italy.

== Career ==
Paraskevaides joined forces with Stelios Ioannou following the end of World War II. Together the two partners founded the Joannou & Paraskevaides company, which is better known as J&P. Their company would eventually grow into a major international construction giant, with dozens of projects throughout Europe, the Middle East, Africa and Asia. J&P went bankrupt in 2018 and was forced into liquidation.

He was also well known for his philanthropic work. He helped to build an organ transplant center in Nicosia, Cyprus. He also paid to send children for medical treatment in the United States.

Paraskevaides received a number of awards and recognitions for his work in both business and philanthropy. He was inducted into the Order of the British Empire by Queen Elizabeth II. He was also awarded the Saint Marcus Medal from the Vatican.

== Death ==
George Paraskevaides died at the London Clinic in London on December 5, 2007, at the age of 91.
