= Philip Bednall =

Australian cricketer

Personal information
- Full name: Philip Malcolm Bednall
- Born: 27 January 1931; Burra, South Australia
- Died: 18 December 2007 (aged 76); Adelaide, South Australia
- Batting: Right-handed
- Role: Batsman

Domestic team information
- Years: Team
- 1948/49: South Australia

Career statistics
Competition	First-class
Matches	2
Runs scored	32
Batting average	8.00
100s/50s	0/0
Top score	19
Catches/stumpings	0/–
- Source: Cricinfo, 24 April 2018

Philip Malcolm Bednall (27 January 1931 – 18 December 2007) was an Australian cricketer. He played two first-class matches for South Australia during the 1948–49 season.
