= Jeani Read =

Jeani Read (February 12, 1947 – December 21, 2007) was a Canadian journalist and columnist and a pioneer in rock music criticism in Canada.

== Biography ==
Read was born in Shanghai to an Estonian mother and English father in 1947. Her family moved to Vancouver when she was a young child and she remained there all her life. She started her career at Vancouver Province in 1973 and her socially conscious column immediately became a must-read. In 1985, her columns were collected into a book called Endless Summers and Other Shared Hallucinations. She was the first full-time rock critic at the Vancouver Province, a former lifestyles columnist and most recently, lifestyles reporter. She died of cancer at St. Paul's Hospital in Vancouver on December 21, 2007, aged 60, and was survived by her husband, playwright Michael Mercer, her father and a brother. She was credited with co-writing several episodes of "The Beachcombers" along with her husband Michael Mercer. One of their collaborations earned them a nomination for a Gemini award.

== Scholarship ==
Jeani Read and her husband Michael Mercer set up a $20,000 fellowship called " Jeani Read-Michael Mercer Fellowship for Journalism Students" to encourage students to continue their journalism career. This scholarship is offered at Langara College in their journalism program.

== Bibliography ==
- Read, Jeani (1985). Endless summers and other shared hallucinations. Vancouver: Flight Press. ISBN 978-0-919843-04-2. OCLC: 16054069.
