= Zabar's =

Specialty food store in New York City

Coordinates: 40°47′5.3″N 73°58′46.5″W

- Logo

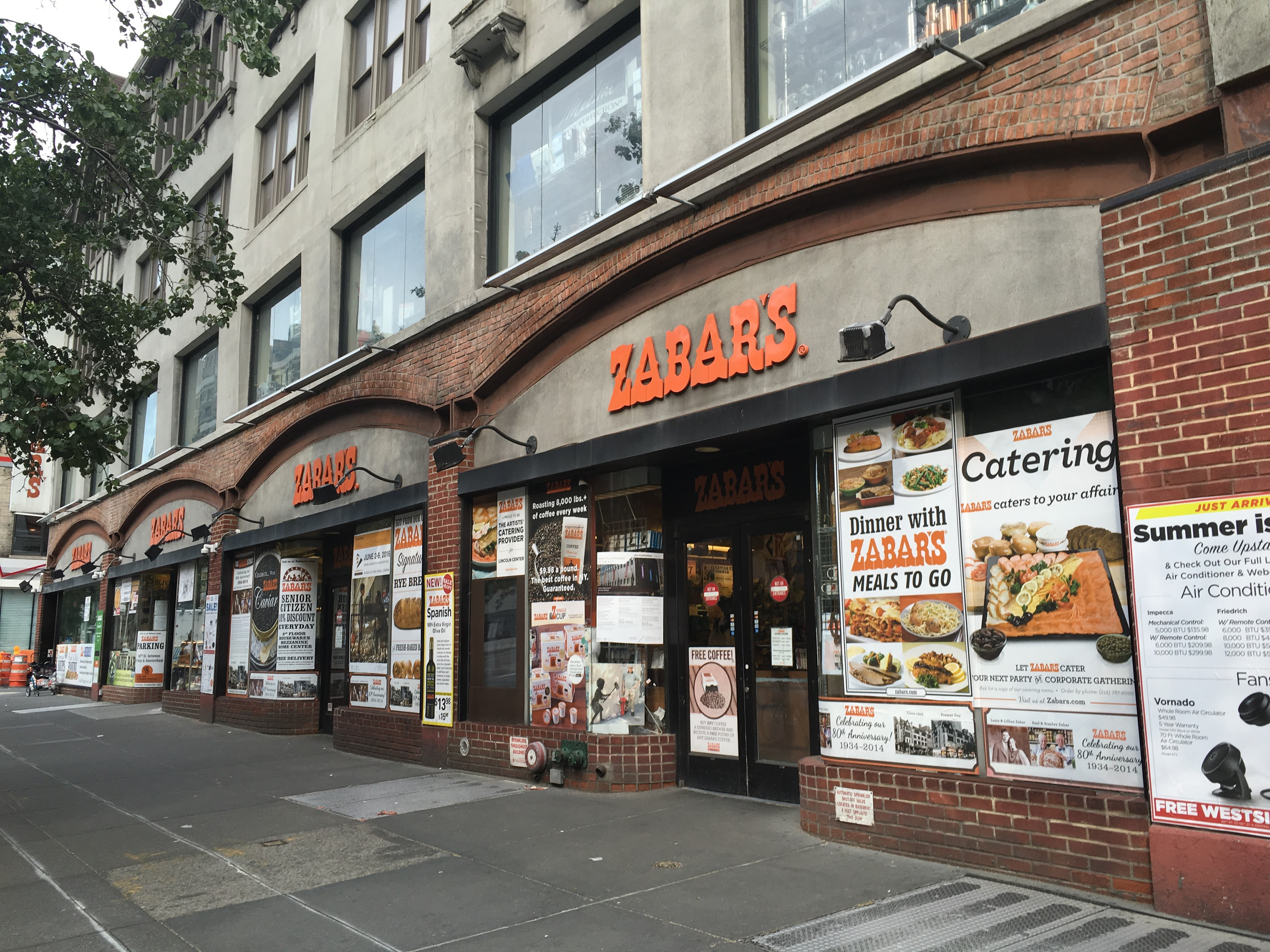
- Front of the Broadway store
- Industry: Specialty market
- Founded: 1934; 92 years ago
- Founders: Louis Zabar; Lillian Zabar
- Headquarters: New York City, New York, U.S.
- Key people: Louis Zabar; Lillian Zabar; Saul Zabar; Murray Klein
- Services: Eatery
- Website: zabars.com

Zabar's (/ˈzeɪ.bɑːrz/ ZAY-barz) is an appetizing store at 2245 Broadway and 80th Street, on the Upper West Side of Manhattan in New York City, founded by Louis and Lillian Zabar. It is known for its selection of bagels, smoked fish, olives, and cheeses. While considered a Jewish delicatessen, Zabar's is not kosher-certified but carries a number of kosher-certified products.

== History ==
Louis Zabar, born Mordko Leib Zabarka, (1901–1950) came to the United States through Canada from Ukraine, Soviet Union, in the early 1920s. His father, also a merchant, had earlier been murdered in a pogrom in Ukraine. Louis first lived in Brooklyn, where he rented a stall in a farmer's market. He married Lillian Teitlebaum (1905–1995) on May 2, 1927, and they had three children: Saul Zabar (1928–2025), Stanley Zabar (1932–2026), and Eli Zabar. Lillian had come to America by herself and settled with relatives in Philadelphia. She moved to New York City and met Louis Zabar, whom she knew from their village in Ukraine. Louis Zabar died in 1950; by that time he owned 10 markets. After the death of Louis, Lillian married Louis Chartoff (1900–1978). From 1960 to 1994, brothers Stanley and Saul Zabar partnered and co-owned Zabar's with Murray Klein, who joined the store in 1953, but was not a member of the Zabar family. Klein officially retired from the store in 1994 and died on December 6, 2007, in New York City.

Importing the Wigomat and other drip coffee makers in the late 1960s, Zabar's was the first shop selling these machines in the United States. By 2006, Zabar's was headed by Saul Zabar as the president and co-owner. He was attending the University of Kansas when his father died. Stanley Zabar served as the vice president and a co-owner. He was a student at Horace Mann School and later the University of Pennsylvania the year his father died. The Zabar Art Library of Hunter College, dedicated in 2008, was made possible through the support of Stanley Zabar and his wife Judith Zabar. A move and expansion in the 1970s made Zabar's one of the largest supermarkets in Manhattan.

In 2011, it was found that Zabar's was selling product labeled as "Lobster Salad" that actually contained no lobster. The New York Times reported that the store "charged $16.95 a pound" for the seafood spread made mostly of salted crawfish and mayonnaise. Saul Zabar initially defended the name, noting that Wikipedia defined crawfish as "related" to lobsters. Zabar's later combined the product's name with the store name and relabeled the spread Zabster Zalad.

Eli Zabar has his own line of specialty shops, which as of 2023 comprises ten outlets. These include the flagship Eli's Market at 1411 Third Avenue, and E.A.T., at Madison Avenue near 80th Street. He also owned the now-closed restaurant and market, Vinegar Factory, on East 91st Street near York Avenue.

In 2022, a book chronicling the history of Zabar's and its food was published: Zabar's: A Family Story With Recipes. The author, Lori Zabar, who died of ovarian cancer in February 2022 at age 67, was the eldest grandchild of the founders, Louis and Lilly Zabar.

Saul Zabar died on October 7, 2025, at the age of 97. Stanley Zabar died on November 9, 2026, at the age of 94.

== Cultural references ==
- The 1998 film You've Got Mail features a scene set at Zabar's where Kathleen Kelly (Meg Ryan) and Joe Fox (Tom Hanks) run into each other while shopping.
- In the Seinfeld episode "The Good Samaritan", upon learning that Elaine told people she dated a matador, Jerry jokes, "I wonder where on the Upper West Side a single girl might meet a matador? Perhaps Zabar's? Or Ray's Pizza?"
- Multiple episodes in the first season of the NBC sitcom Mad About You feature the store as a cultural reference. The characters Mark Devanow (Richard Kind) and Fran Devanow (Leila Kenzle) frequently bring food from Zabar's to dinner at Paul and Jamie Buchman's apartment, with the store's signature orange bag visible on screen.
- The music video of Vampire Weekend's "Sunflower" was filmed in Zabar's.
- Aaron Sorkin's TV shows have used Zabar's as a cultural signifier. In season 7, episode 6 of The West Wing ("The Al Smith Dinner"), the character Louise Thornton, played by Janeane Garofalo, says, "We can't run a campaign for editorial writers. We'd have 12 votes, half of them within walking distance of Zabar's" in response to Democratic nominee Matt Santos's concern that The New York Times might endorse Republican nominee Arnold Vinick. In Studio 60 on the Sunset Strip, Steven Weber's network chairman Jack Rudolph mocks Bradley Whitford's producer Danny Tripp by telling him that, if they swapped jobs, the network would lose money but would be the "number one rated network within a one-mile radius of Zabar's and the Chateau Marmont".

== Gallery ==
Store front

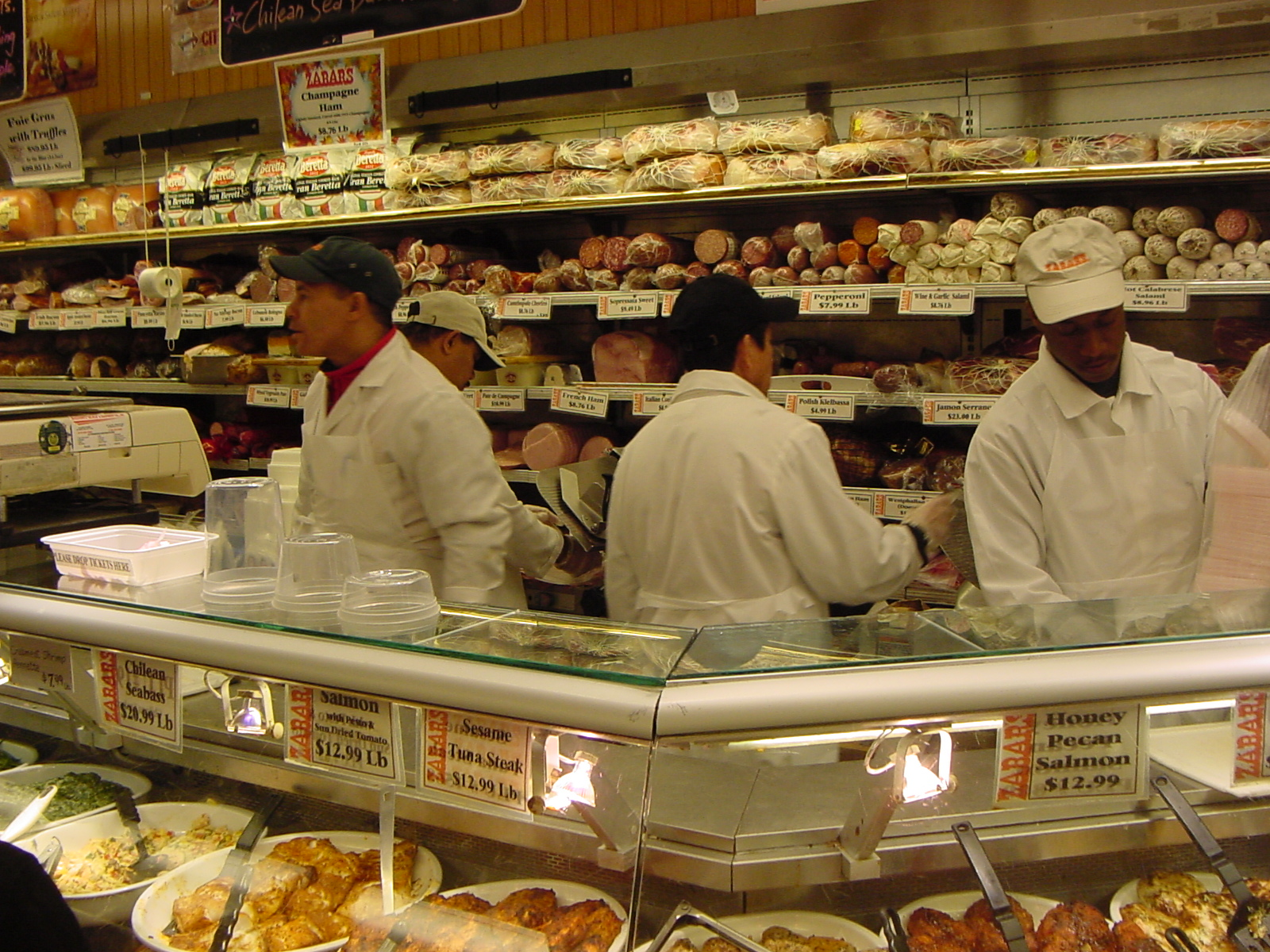
Deli at Zabar's

Store front at night

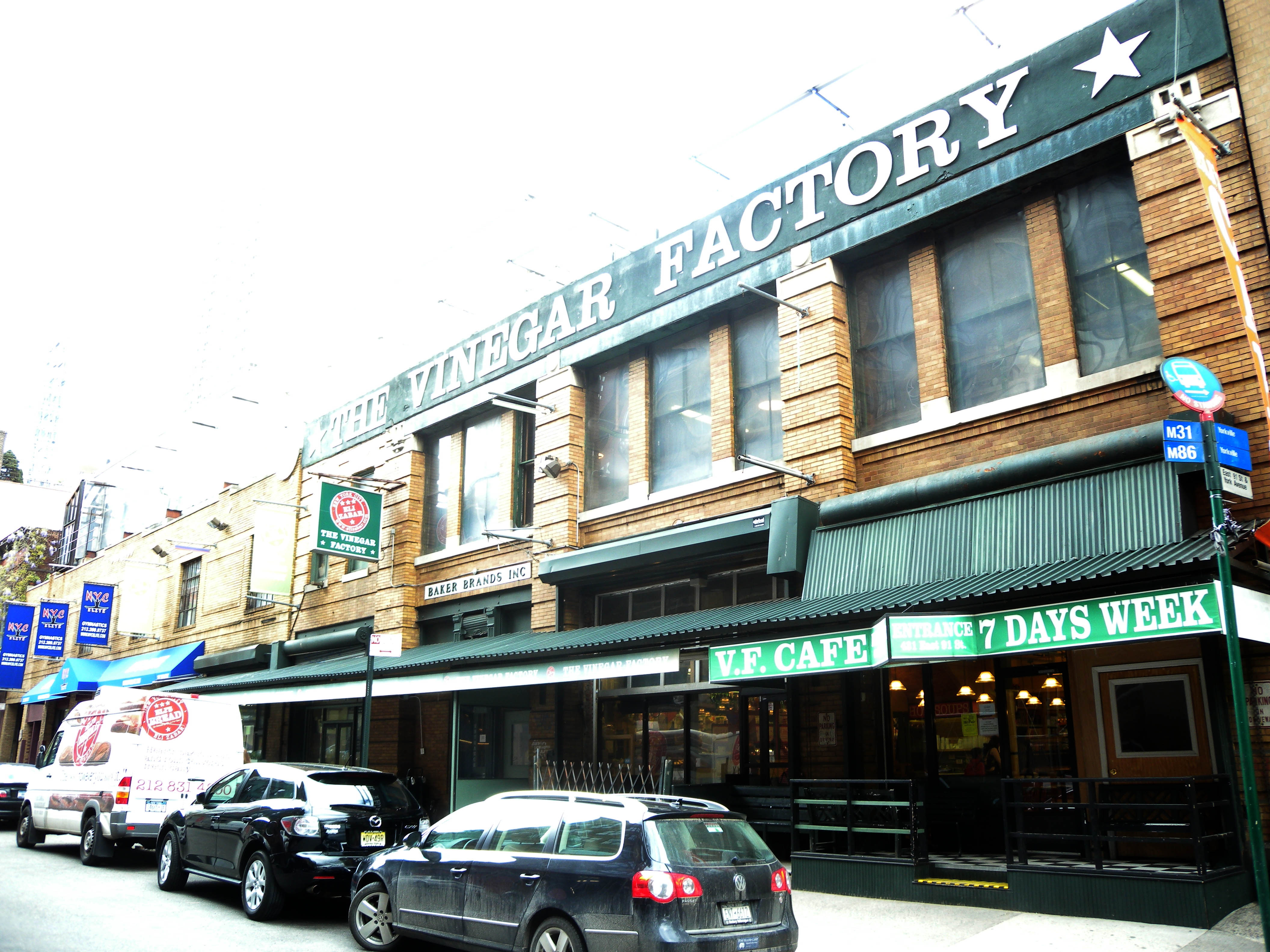
The Vinegar Factory

== See also ==
- List of Ashkenazi Jewish restaurants
- List of Jewish delis
