= Jennifer Davidson (executive) =

American businesswoman

- Born: 1969; Pittsburgh, Pennsylvania, U.S.
- Died: December 1, 2007 (aged 38); Atlanta, Georgia, U.S.
- Occupation: Vice President of The Cartoon Network, Inc.
- Known for: Starting Adult Swim

Jennifer Kate Stitt Davidson (1969 – December 1, 2007) was an American businesswoman and Vice President of The Cartoon Network, Inc. until her death in 2007.

== Early life ==
Davidson was born in Pittsburgh, Pennsylvania in 1969. She graduated from Virginia Tech in 1991 with a bachelor's degree in broadcast communications.

== Career ==
Davidson was hired as an operations and production assistant by The Cartoon Network, Inc. in 1993 after the company was established in 1992. She later served as director of on-air promotion operations and production during the company's early years.

Her previous positions included the company's Vice President of marketing, consumer products, ad trade and strategic operations. She was involved in the creation of several Cartoon Network brands. Davidson helped create and launch Cartoon Network's Adult Swim block programming in September 2001. She was also executive producer of Boomerang, Cartoon Network's classic spin-off channel.

Davidson was promoted to Cartoon Network's Senior Vice President of programming and scheduling in September 2007, after over 14 years with the company. She held that position until her death on December 1, 2007.

Davidson had received a number of industry and marketing awards during her time at Cartoon Network. Among her honors was a BDA Gold Award for total package design for her promotion of Boomerang in 2000. Most recently, Davidson was also chosen as a 2007–08 Betsy Magness Leadership Fellow.

== Death ==
Jennifer Davidson died of a sudden illness on December 1, 2007, in Atlanta, Georgia. She was 38 years old and had served as Cartoon Network's Senior Vice President of programming and scheduling for three months at the time of her death. She was survived by her husband, John, three children, and both parents.
