= Robert Morris (cricketer) =

Welsh cricketer

Personal information
- Full name: Robert John Morris
- Born: 27 November 1926; Penllergaer, Swansea, Glamorgan
- Died: 29 December 2007 (aged 81); Harrow, Middlesex
- Batting: Right-handed
- Bowling: Right-arm off-break
- Role: Opening batsman
- Relatives: Vernon Morris (father)

Domestic team information
- Years: Team
- 1949–1951: Cambridge University
- 1950: Kent
- FC debut: 4 May 1949 Cambridge University v Sussex
- Last FC: 27 June 1951 Cambridge University v MCC

Career statistics
Competition	First-class
Matches	22
Runs scored	778
Batting average	22.88
100s/50s	0/4
Top score	96
Balls bowled	402
Wickets	2
Bowling average	96.00
5 wickets in innings	0
10 wickets in match	0
Best bowling	1/38
Catches/stumpings	7/–
- Source: Cricinfo, 5 April 2014

Robert John Morris (27 November 1926 – 29 December 2007) was a Welsh cricketer. He played for Cambridge University and Kent County Cricket Club, making a total of 22 appearances in first-class cricket matches between 1949 and 1951.

Morris was born at Swansea in South Wales in 1926, the son of Vernon Morris who played for Glamorgan in the 1920s. He attended Blundell's School where he captained the school side and was selected to play for the public schools at Lord's in both 1944 and 1945. After scoring 571 runs and taking 33 wickets in 1944―when Wisden called him "outstanding"― he played for The Rest against Lord's Schools, and "displayed batting and bowling promise" for the Public Schools side against a Lord's XI, a match briefly interrupted by a flying bomb exploding near to the ground.

The previous season he had dismissed seven batsmen in his opening over of a match and taken ten wickets against Clifton College, and in 1945 he was considered "the best" all-rounder in schools cricket by Wisden. He scored 558 runs at an average of 46.50 runs per innings and took 43 wickets with a bowling average of 7.41 runs, easily the best in both categories at Blundell's, and Wisden was again complementary, describing him as "a thoroughly competent cricketer" and that he has "led the side skilfully". After completing his National Service he attended Trinity Hall, Cambridge, where he studied history, and made his first-class debut for the university side against Sussex in 1949, scoring 96 on debut and winning his Blue as a freshman.

After first playing for Kent's Second XI in 1948, Morris made two appearances for the county's First XI in the 1950 County Championship, although he did not play for Cambridge at all that season, preferring to concentrate on his academic studies. He played for the university in 1951 but was dropped before the University Match after a run of poor form.

Morris played no first-class cricket after leaving Cambridge, although he continued to play for Beckenham Cricket Club and Band of Brothers, an amateur side closely associated with Kent. He worked as a teacher, married and had two children. He died at his home in Harrow in 2007 aged 81.
