= Kinkri Devi =

Indian environmentalist

- Born: 30 January 1925
- Died: 30 December 2007 (aged 82)
- Occupations: Indian activist and environmentalist

Kinkri Devi (30 January 1925 – 30 December 2007) was an Indian activist and environmentalist, best known for waging a war on illegal mining and quarrying in her native state of Himachal Pradesh. She never knew how to read or write and learned how to sign her name a few years before her death.

She became well known for her poverty, which was eventually eased by a US-based charity organisation of Himachal Pradesh later in life after reading a Punjabi newspaper account of her living conditions.

== Early childhood ==
Devi was born in the village of Ghaton in the Sirmaur district in 1925. Her father was a substinance farmer of the Dalit, or untouchable caste. She began working as a servant during her early childhood and married bonded laborer Shamu Ram at age 14. Ram died of typhoid fever when he was 22.

While working at her new job as a sweeper, Devi noticed the massive quarrying in some parts of Himachal Pradesh's hills, harming the water supply and destroying paddy fields. At this point Devi decided to take on the mining herself.

== Activism ==
A local volunteering group, the People's Action for People in Need, backed Devi as she filed a public interest lawsuit in Himachal Pradesh High Court in Shimla against 48 mine owners. She accused that the quarriers were being reckless in their mining of limestone, though the group denied all allegations against them, claiming she was simply blackmailing them.

Her suit got virtually no response, so Devi went on a 19-day hunger strike outside the court. When the court decided to take up the issue, Devi had become a national celebrity. The court ordered in 1987 a stay on mining and imposed a blanket ban on blasting in her beloved hills. The mine owners appealed to the Supreme Court of India, who rejected their appeal in July 1995. Interest was taken upon her by then first lady Hillary Clinton, and that same year Devi was invited to attend the International Women's Conference in Beijing. She was asked to light the lamp in the beginning of the ceremonies, and spoke of the cause she was fighting against and how ordinary people can make an impact.

Despite the Supreme Court's ruling, illegal mining still continued in the hills and forest preserves, though on a decreased scale. Besides her environmentalism, one of Devi's other endeavors was campaigning for the creation of a degree-granting college in Sangrah. She claimed that while it wasn't right for her to study, she didn't want "others to suffer the way I did for want of education."

== Death ==
Devi died 30 December 2007 in Chandigarh, India aged 82.

== Awards ==
- In 1999, Devi was awarded the Stree Shakti Puraskar by the Government of India.
