= Iosif Dan =

Romanian politician

Iosif Dan (commonly known as Dan Iosif, 14 October 1950 – 5 December 2007) was a Romanian politician who was a leading figure in the 1989 Romanian Revolution, leading protests in Bucharest in the final days of Nicolae Ceauşescu's 25-year rule.

Iosif was born in Bucharest. In 1969, he graduated from 'Şcoala de maiştri militari', a military school in Sibiu, Romania. Iosif was a presidential adviser and faithful political adept of Ion Iliescu, permanently being a member of Iliescu's party (FSN, FDSN, PDSR, and PSD). He served as a senator for multiple terms, and during his final days he was a member of the Romanian Chamber of Deputies. A controversial figure, in 2006 he was heard in connection to the 1990 Mineriad, being investigated under suspicion of crimes against humanity and undermining state power, along with some twenty others. Iosif died of lung cancer in a clinic in Novosibirsk, Russia, where he had been undergoing treatment since November 2007.
