= Saul Zabar =

American businessman (1928–2025)

- Born: June 4, 1928; New York City, U.S.
- Died: October 7, 2025 (aged 97); New York City, U.S.
- Spouse: Carole Ann Kishner (m. 1968)
- Children: 3
- Mother: Lillian Zabar

Saul Zabar (June 4, 1928 – October 7, 2025) was an American businessman and principal owner of Zabar's delicatessen. He was the son of its founders Lillian and Louis Zabar.

Zabar died on October 7, 2025, at the age of 97. He was described as "a true New York legend" by New York City mayor Eric Adams, and honored by the MTA with a poster at 79th Street subway station.
