= Battista Serioli =

- Born: 26 November 1900; Brescia, Italy
- Died: 21 December 2007 (aged 107); Sale Marasino, Italy
- Military career
- Allegiance: (Italy) Italian
- Branch: Italian Army
- Service years: May 1918–1921
- Conflicts: Battle of Vittorio Veneto

Battista Serioli (26 November 1900 – 21 December 2007) was one of the last four Italian veterans of the First World War, although excluded from Italian government lists as it only counts those with more than six months of service. Born in Brescia, Serioli signed up in May 1918. He did his training in Verona and Padua, and fought in the Battle of Vittorio Veneto. He also later worked as an administrator, staying in the Italian Army until 1921. He died in Sale Marasino aged 107.
