= István Borzsák =

Hungarian classical scholar (1914–2007)

István Borzsák (24 December 1914, Monor - 9 December 2007, Budapest), was a Hungarian classical scholar who was a specialist in Roman literature. He was a member of the Hungarian Academy of Sciences.

== Selected publications ==
- Budai Ézsaiás és klasszika-filológiánk kezdetei, Akadémiai Kiadó, Budapest, 1955.
- P. Cornelius Tacitus, der Geschichtsschreiber, A. Druckenmüller, Stuttgart, 1968.
