= Jonathan Witchell =

Jonathan Witchell (20 September 1974 – 15 December 2007) was a BBC reporter who worked for Radio Kent from 1998 until his death. He was a two time Shepherd Neame Kent Journalist of the Year, in 2004 and 2006.

He was born and raised in Sevenoaks in Kent and studied at the University of Salford for his bachelor's degree and University of Stirling for his master's degree. He died in 2007 after a short illness.
