= H. D. Thoreau Jr. =

American journalist

H. D. Thoreau Jr. (April 13, 1923 – December 29, 2007) was a track and field authority as well as an Olympic official.

== Early life and career ==
Thoreau was born in Denver, when he was young he moved with his family to California. He attended his first Olympic games in 1932 when he was 9 years old. Enthralled with baseball as a young man but not a gifted athlete, he used his ability with numbers to keep track of team sports. He would eventually apply that gift to track and field. After graduating from high school in Pasadena, California. Thoreau completed two years at Stanford University before serving in US Army Intelligence during World War II. After the war, he completed his degree at Stanford, majoring in journalism. He was president of his graduating class in 1947.

Thoreau was a distant relation of the Henry David Thoreau

In the early 1950s, he went to work in New York for the NCAA, where he was one of the early editors of the NCAA college sports guides.

In 1956 California state officials appointed him general manager of the 1960 Winter Olympics. As general manager, he oversaw construction of many of the facilities. "That was four years of the hardest work I've ever done," Mr. Thoreau once told the Times. For the 1984 Games, Mr. Thoreau oversaw the renovation of Los Angeles Memorial Coliseum facilities that included the installation of the composition track with new curbs for better drainage and safer running. Thanks to Thoreau's knowledge with statistics that year had some of the best scoreboards available.

== Death ==
For several years after he retired Thoreau contracted Alzheimer's. On 29 December 2007, Thoreau died at the age of 84. His death was attributed to Alzheimer's and stroke.
