= Tadayuki Inoue =

Japanese baseball player (1935–2007)

Nishitetsu Lions
- Born: October 25, 1935; Fukuoka Prefecture
- Died: December 15, 2007 (aged 72)
- Batted: right Threw: right

debut
- 1957

Last appearance
- 1964
- Stats at Baseball Reference

Tadayuki Inoue (井上 忠行, Inoue Tadayuki; October 25, 1935 – December 15, 2007) was a Japanese baseball player who played for the Nishitetsu Lions from 1957 to 1964. His career on-base plus slugging was .506, with a high of .586 for 1962 and a low of .299 for 1957. After retiring, he became a professional baseball umpire.
