= Marnesba Tackett =

American activist (1908–2007)

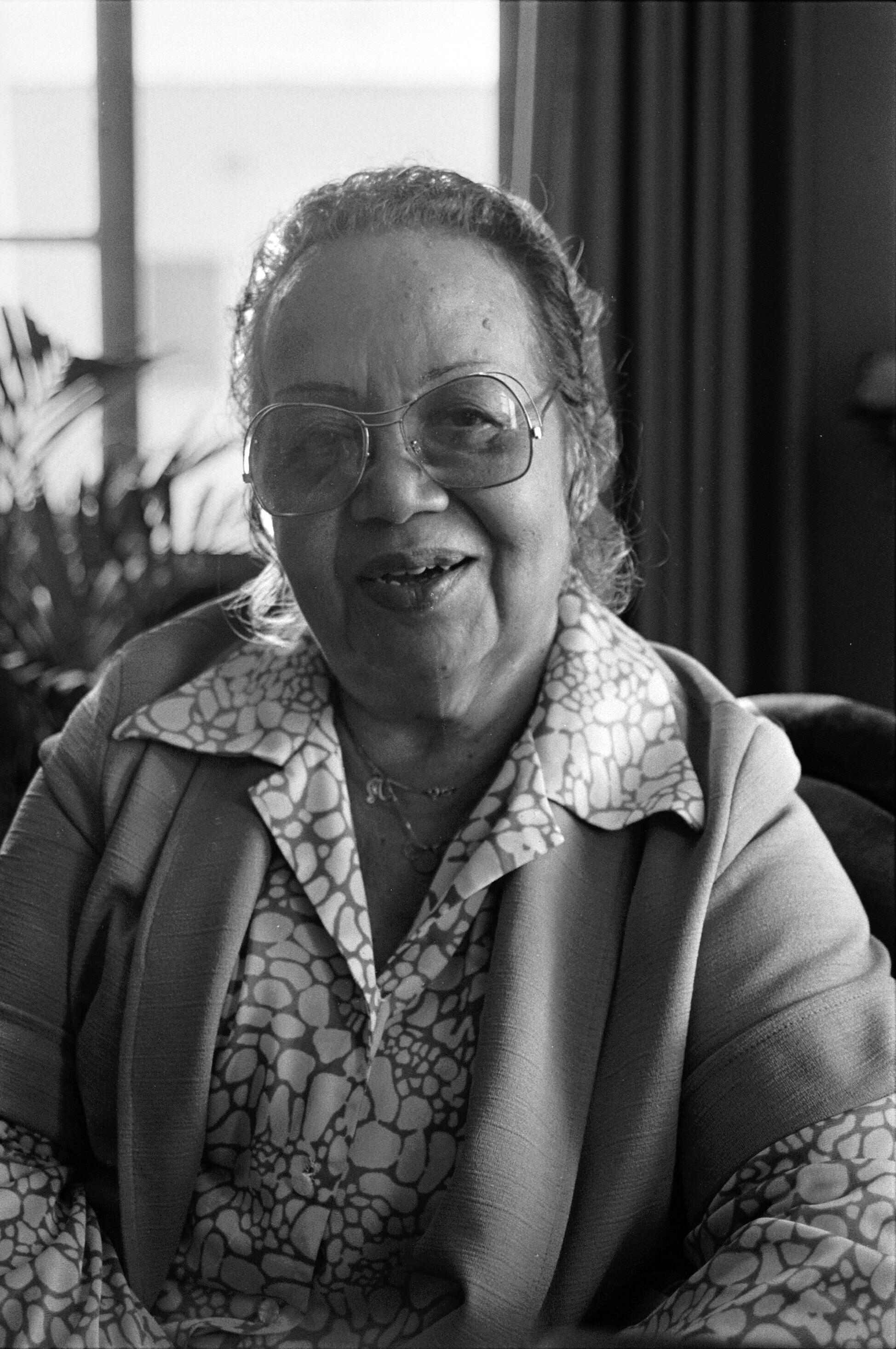
Tackett in 1982

Marnesba Tillmon Tackett (February 4, 1908 – December 17, 2007) was an activist in the Civil Rights Movement known for her role in working for school desegregation in Los Angeles, California.

Tackett was a lifelong activist, organizing Martin Luther King, Jr.'s visit to Wrigley Field in 1963 and participating in the Selma march in 1965. She was involved with the NAACP in Los Angeles, and in 1963 was unanimously elected as the education chair for the United Civil Rights Council (UCRC), which placed her at the forefront of education activism in Los Angeles from the 1960s to the 1980s.

== Early life ==
Marnesba Tackett was born Marnesba Tillmon in Kansas City, Kansas, on February 4, 1908, to Ivory and Elizabeth Edwards Adkins. She spent most of her early life in Kansas City, graduating from Sumner High School, where she met her husband Joseph Edgar Tackett, a minister.

Tackett graduated with a degree in social sciences from Kansas City College and worked selling insurance. She participated in sit-ins and protests throughout the 1930s and 1940s, both in Kansas City and in other states. In 1952, Tackett and her husband moved to Los Angeles, where he was installed as associate minister of Second Baptist Church.

== Activism in Los Angeles ==
=== 1950s ===
After the Brown v. Board decision, many civil rights leaders in Los Angeles began to protest the treatment of racial minorities in the Los Angeles Unified School District. Black students were forced into overcrowded schools, many of which had double-session days to accommodate the large number of students they taught. In addition, the city's teachers were almost universally white, and majority-black schools lacked the resources that their white-dominated schools enjoyed. Many schools funneled minority students into vocational programs rather than preparing them for college, and textbooks used by the Los Angeles school system contained racist caricatures of black Americans.

Concerned by the segregation in Los Angeles' schools, Tackett ran for and was elected as the chair of the local NAACP's education committee, where she won a lawsuit against the city's racist textbooks.

=== 1960s and 1970s ===
As the Civil Rights Movement gained momentum in the south during the late 1950s and early 1960s, many activists in northern and western states began to push against the de facto segregation that dominated cities in the region, especially in the school systems. During the era, Los Angeles was more segregated than many southern cities.

In response to this discrimination, the NAACP, CORE, and other civil rights organizations called for a desegregation movement in Los Angeles. In 1961, Martin Luther King, Jr. spoke to a crowd of 28,000 people; two years later, he returned to speak at Wrigley Field to a crowd of 35,000, a rally which Tackett helped organize.

Tackett joined the board of the Los Angeles SCLC in 1966, a post she held until 1976, eventually becoming the organization's first female executive director. In this role, she worked to desegregate Los Angeles county schools, bringing several cases to the courts while working with the ACLU.

=== Later life ===
In her later life, Tackett remained involved in SCLC West, holding leadership positions throughout the 1970s and 1980s.

Tackett died on December 17, 2007, at the age of 99.
