= St. Nicholas Cathedral (Washington, D.C.) =

Cathedral of the Orthodox Church in America

Coordinates: 38.9249°N 77.0686°W

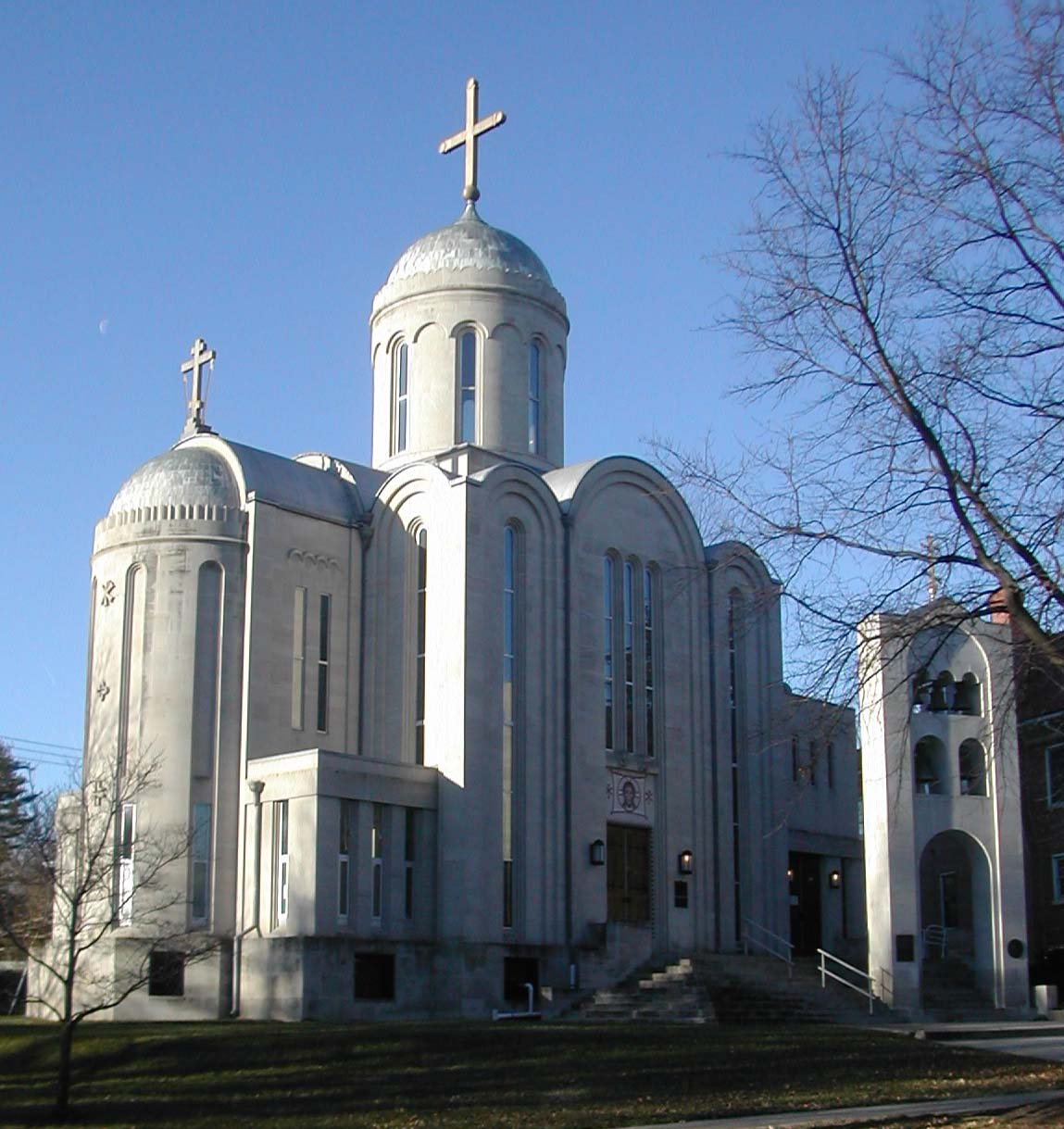
St Nicholas Cathedral - Washington, DC

St. Nicholas Cathedral (Russian: Свято-Николаевский собор) in Washington, D.C., is the primatial cathedral of the Orthodox Church in America and the seat of Tikhon, Archbishop of Washington, Metropolitan of All America and Canada of the Orthodox Church in America.

== General information and history ==
The original parish church was founded in 1930 as the Russian Orthodox Church of Saint Nicholas. In 1949 the Synod of Bishops authorized the parish to be the church's National War Memorial Shrine and a national campaign to build a monumental Orthodox church in the capital of the United States was begun. The property upon which the cathedral is built was purchased in 1951. The substructure (basement) was completed in 1954 and was used for church services until the superstructure was completed in late 1962. A bell tower commemorating the millennium of Christianity in Russia was dedicated in 1988.

== Architecture and iconography ==
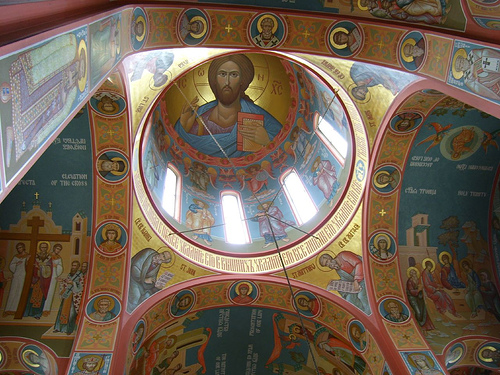
Central dome of St Nicholas Cathedral - Washington, DC

The cathedral architecture is based on the 12th century St. Demetrius Cathedral of Vladimir, Russia. Beginning in 1991, dedicated iconographers from Moscow led by Alexander Maskalionov painted icons throughout the nave in the traditional style. This work was completed in 1994.

== Location ==
The cathedral is at 3500 Massachusetts Ave NW at the corner of Edmund Street, in the District of Columbia. The 31, 32, and 36 buses stop nearby, whereas the 37, N2, N3, N4, and N6 buses stop directly outside the cathedral at the Massachusetts Avenue-Edmunds St. intersection. There is no direct Metro access to the cathedral, but there are several stops within walking distance, such as Woodley Park, Cleveland Park, and Van Ness-UDC.
