= Citizens Lobbying for Animals in Zoos =

Informal organization to improve conditions for the animals in California zoos

Citizens Lobbying for Animals in Zoos (CLAZ) was an informal organization lobbying to improve conditions for the animals in California zoos, started in 1996 by then 13-year-old Justin Barker.

== Founding ==
The organization was started in Sacramento, California in 1996 by then 13-year-old Justin Barker. Barker started the organization to advocate for animals in the Sacramento Zoo, which he felt were not well housed or managed. Barker worked with the Animal Protection Institute and the National Council for Excellence in Zoo Animal Management to bring media attention to the substandard conditions at the zoo.

On March 11, 1996, the Association of Zoos and Aquariums "tabled" the Sacramento Zoo's accreditation based on inadequate staffing for animal care and inadequate funding for operational and capital improvement needs. Extensive recommendations were made by the city to address the concerns. Included was the appointment of Gerald Caplan, then Dean of the McGeorge School of Law, to chair an independent review of the accusations of inadequate animal care, which the city stated were not a significant part of the accreditation issues but arose later. Barker credits the work of the organization for the zoo's accreditation having been revoked.

CLAZ' recommendation to close the polar bear and cheetah exhibits took place 4 years later.

== Roseville Bear Relocation Project ==
In 1996, the Roseville Bear Relocation Project drew attention to the Roseville Royer Park Zoo, which held two black bears in cramped and unsanitary conditions. Barker's initiative was featured in a television program that drew attention to his fundraising efforts. After raising over $250,000 through the Roseville Bear Relocation Fund, the zoo was closed and the bears were successfully relocated to the Folsom City Zoo Sanctuary. Barker tells the story in a short video, "Justin and the two bears."

== San Francisco Zoo ==
In 2008, Barker having relocated to San Francisco, relaunched the organization to advocate for the welfare of big cats at the San Francisco Zoo. After a tiger attack had killed a zoo visitor and injured two others (see San Francisco Zoo tiger attacks), the big cats spent two months in small indoor cages before being released into a more secure outdoor area. Barker's "No Lion House" campaign advocated to close the existing cages and build a new natural facility for the tigers and lions.

He was instrumental in the release of a report from San Francisco Animal Control and Welfare Commission about the misuse of 1997 bond money to improve zoo conditions. On March 18, 2008, the San Francisco Animal Control and Welfare Commission released a report that revealed the promises to overhaul its decaying animal enclosures, rebuild its entrance, expand educational facilities for children, and make a host of other improvements were never kept and recommended the San Francisco Zoo become a rescue facility.
