= Robert Hermes =

Robert Hermes (born November 15, 1969, in Celle, West Germany) is a veterinarian researcher at The Leibniz-Institute of Zoo and Wildlife Research in Berlin. He studied veterinary medicine at the Freie Universität Berlin. He completed a Ph.D. in reproductive management.

== Research ==
Hermes was a member of the Indianapolis Zoo team, that accomplished the world’s first successful artificial insemination of an African elephant. He completed a postdoctoral research project concentrated on the reproductive management of African elephants. Hermes is a researcher at The Leibniz Institute for Zoo and Wildlife Research(IZW), in the department of reproductive management. His research concentrates on the reproductive management of elephants and rhinoceros. Hermes has supervised doctoral candidates researching reproductive management in a variety of animal species.

Hermes is a member of the IZW researchers in animal reproductive management. Thomas Bernd Hildebrandt, head of the IZW Department of Reproductive Management, is internationally recognized as the leader in elephant reproductive research. Hermes, Hildebrandt, and Frank Goeritz of the IZW have served for several years as reproductive consultants for the Pittsburgh Zoo. The Pittsburgh Zoo & PPG Aquariam (PZ) and Leibniz Institute for Zoo and Wildlife Research (Berlin, Germany) have in joint partnership conducted collaborative research on elephant reproduction. Dr. Hermes is an internationally recognized wildlife reproduction expert and researcher.
