= Death of Maddox Derkosh =

Death of American boy in animal attack

- Date: November 4, 2012; 14 years ago
- Location: Pittsburgh Zoo & Aquarium, Pittsburgh, Pennsylvania, U.S.
- Type: Animal attack
- Deaths: 1 (Maddox Lamar Derkosh)
- Charges: None
- Litigation: Wrongful death lawsuit by Derkosh's mother against zoo settled for undisclosed amount

Maddox Lamar Derkosh was a two year old American boy killed in an animal attack after falling into an African wild dog exhibit at The Pittsburgh Zoo & PPG Aquarium on November 4, 2012. The exhibit featured a special observation deck for viewing the dogs; Maddox's mother, Elizabeth Derkosh, lifted her son up onto the railing of the exhibit for "a better view" despite numerous warning signs posted and barriers established. Maddox Derkosh slipped, falling 14 feet (4.3 m) from the railing, past a catch-all safety net built for collecting falling debris, and into the painted dog enclosure, where he was immediately mauled by eleven of the wild dogs. One of the dogs was shot and killed by a police officer on the scene, while zoo staff tried to detain the remaining dogs. Maddox Derkosh was rapidly torn apart and eviscerated by the dogs, and bled to death before anybody was able to reach him. Elizabeth Derkosh was accused by the zoo of criminal negligence in a court filing, but was never prosecuted, having filed her own lawsuit against the zoo and later settling out of court.

== Exhibit ==
The zoo's African painted dog exhibit consisted of a large number of the dogs kept within an enclosure, near which was a solid structure made mostly of wood material with a viewing deck allowing visitors to watch the dogs from above. Below the deck was a catch-all safety net intended to gather any falling debris so that nothing would accidentally end up in the enclosure. The exhibit featured a number of warning signs urging visitors to be careful when using the deck, while staff of the zoo claimed that visitors were briefed on the dangers of wild animals. In a report for ABC News, Jack Hanna argued that African painted dogs are a very aggressive species, as he had worked around them in the 1990s during the filming of his series Jack Hanna's Wild Countdown. Hanna stated in the interview, "I don't care if a zookeeper, a policeman, a tranquilizer gun, whatever would have been right there, could not have helped. Sorry is not a word that... that I can even say... condolences? I don't know what word to use, but my heart aches right now for everybody." The zoo had never had any visitor death on record until the incident with Maddox Derkosh occurred.

== Attack on Maddox Derkosh ==
On November 4, 2012, Maddox Derkosh visited the Pittsburgh Zoo & PPG Aquarium with parents Jason and Elizabeth Derkosh. When the family reached the painted dogs enclosure, Elizabeth wandered past the warning signs with Maddox and lifted him atop the rail of the viewing deck.

It was, according to zoo staffer Lou Nene, not uncommon to see parents hoisting their kids up onto this exhibit's railing to view the dogs, despite numerous warnings from staff about such behaviour. A catch-all safety net below was only intended to rescue small objects like cell phones, cameras and sunglasses dropped by visitors, and was not sufficient to sustain the weight of a human child.

Maddox slipped from Elizabeth's grasp, bounced off the safety net, and landed on the ground of the enclosure several feet below, where the dog pack immediately proceeded to attack him. Elizabeth screamed and tried to break into the enclosure to rescue her son; she was restrained by another guest. Some zoo attendees claimed to hear Elizabeth screaming for help from a distance, while those nearby were able to see the attack. One of the dogs was shot and killed by a police officer on the scene in order to get it away from Maddox; none of the other dogs were harmed during the incident.

== Death ==
It was initially unclear in most news coverage of the case whether Maddox had been killed by the lengthy fall to the ground, or by the dogs themselves. Eventually it was revealed that Maddox had still been fully conscious after the fall, and that the dogs had torn his body apart while mauling and biting him, after which the boy was finally approached when it was safe to attempt a rescue. Maddox's internal organs had been destroyed by the dogs tearing at them, and he had suffered more than 46 wounds to his head and neck. By the time veterinarian Barbara Baker and other zoo staff arrived on the scene, they determined it would be futile to try to rescue Maddox. According to Baker, "it was clear the child was dead. There was no reason to send our staff into harm’s way." Maddox bled to death, and what was left of his body was eventually recovered and sent to a medical examiner for investigation after the remaining painted dogs were detained.

== Negligence debate ==
Maddox's killing triggered a lengthy debate between the Derkosh family and The Pittsburgh Zoo & PPG Aquarium, which escalated into lawsuits and court filings. The zoo argued that it was not at fault for the attack on Maddox, and moreover, that Elizabeth was reckless and negligent in deliberately lifting her son up atop the railing when she had explicitly been told not to. Elizabeth, in turn, argued that the zoo was irresponsible in the design and operation of the enclosure and viewing deck; her lawsuit, which sought damages of US$300,000, brought to light that there was only an "ill-fitting window" to prevent visitors from getting too close to the railing, and that the painted dogs were roaming loose. There had, it was later revealed, also been a previous case where the zoo had to be temporarily put in lockdown because of the dogs escaping their enclosure and wandering around the greater zoo property, although nobody had been injured or killed by them.

In response to the allegations made by Lou Nene, which became integral to Elizabeth's lawsuit, the zoo denied claims that officials had received any warning from staff that parents regularly lifted their children onto the unprotected area overlooking the wild dogs exhibit and did nothing to protect them. The zoo also claimed that the railing surrounding the enclosure complied with building and safety codes, and denied claims that it lacked an emergency plan at the time of the incident. The zoo removed the observation deck a month after the mauling. The exhibit displaying the wild dogs, which are an endangered species and native to sub-Saharan Africa, was shuttered shortly after. It was later replaced with a cheetah exhibit. "The USDA has conducted 35 inspections at the painted dog exhibit since its opening in 2006. At no time have any concerns or violations regarding this exhibit been identified by the regulatory agency," said Public and Media Relations Manager Tracy Gray in defence of the zoo.

Elizabeth Derkosh was not charged with negligence despite the accusations made against her. The Pittsburgh Zoo & PPG Aquarium received some public and media backlash for its treatment towards the grieving mother; Robert Mongeluzzi, a lawyer for the Derkosh family, said in a statement that "the zoo's position is dead wrong and shameful", while Allegheny County District Attorney Stephen A Zappala, Jr. declared Maddox Derkosh's killing a "tragic accident" while adding that Elizabeth would not face any charges despite the zoo's claims. The Derkosh family and The Pittsburgh Zoo & PPG Aquarium eventually settled out of court for an undisclosed amount.

== Relocation of the African painted dogs ==
African painted dogs are an endangered species and the act of killing 1 out of the 11 dogs attacking Maddox had been an emergency measure to try and get to Maddox's body and attempt a rescue. The other dogs were not killed or harmed, but instead relocated to various undisclosed locations. "We want our visitors to enjoy a family fun and safe environment while learning about our animals. Unfortunately, the painted dogs would have been a continuous reminder of the accident and would distract from educational opportunities to learn about this wonderful and endangered species," stated The Pittsburgh Zoo & PPG Aquarium.

== Social impact ==
The killing of Maddox Derkosh has been compared in the media with similar incidents at zoos, theme parks and aquariums, including the San Francisco Zoo tiger attacks, the death of Deborah "Debbie" Gail Stone on the Disneyland ride America Sings, and the killing of SeaWorld trainer Dawn Brancheau. While the incident was very gory and intense in nature, Maddox's death inspired numerous respect pages, memorials and tributes, including an online tribute page on Forever Missed and an obituary page from Slater Funeral Service. Father David Bonnar of St. Bernard Church in Mount Lebanon, where Maddox's burial Mass was held, stated, "Maddox was a happy child who loved life and giggled a lot. If he were asked to draw a picture of God he would probably draw a picture of a truck." Maddox's adoration for trucks inspired Elizabeth and Jason Derkosh to create a fundraiser in their son's memory, which involved asking the public for donations of toy trucks, which were then donated to impoverished children for Christmas presents. The fundraiser drew in thousands of donated toys, mostly from strangers who did not personally know the Derkosh Family, but who had been disturbed by the story of his death and inspired to help.

== See also ==
- African painted dogs
- Dawn Brancheau
- San Francisco Zoo tiger attacks
- Death of Chloe Rae Margaret Wiegand
