= San Francisco Zoo =

Zoo and gardens in San Francisco, California, United States

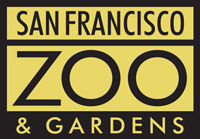

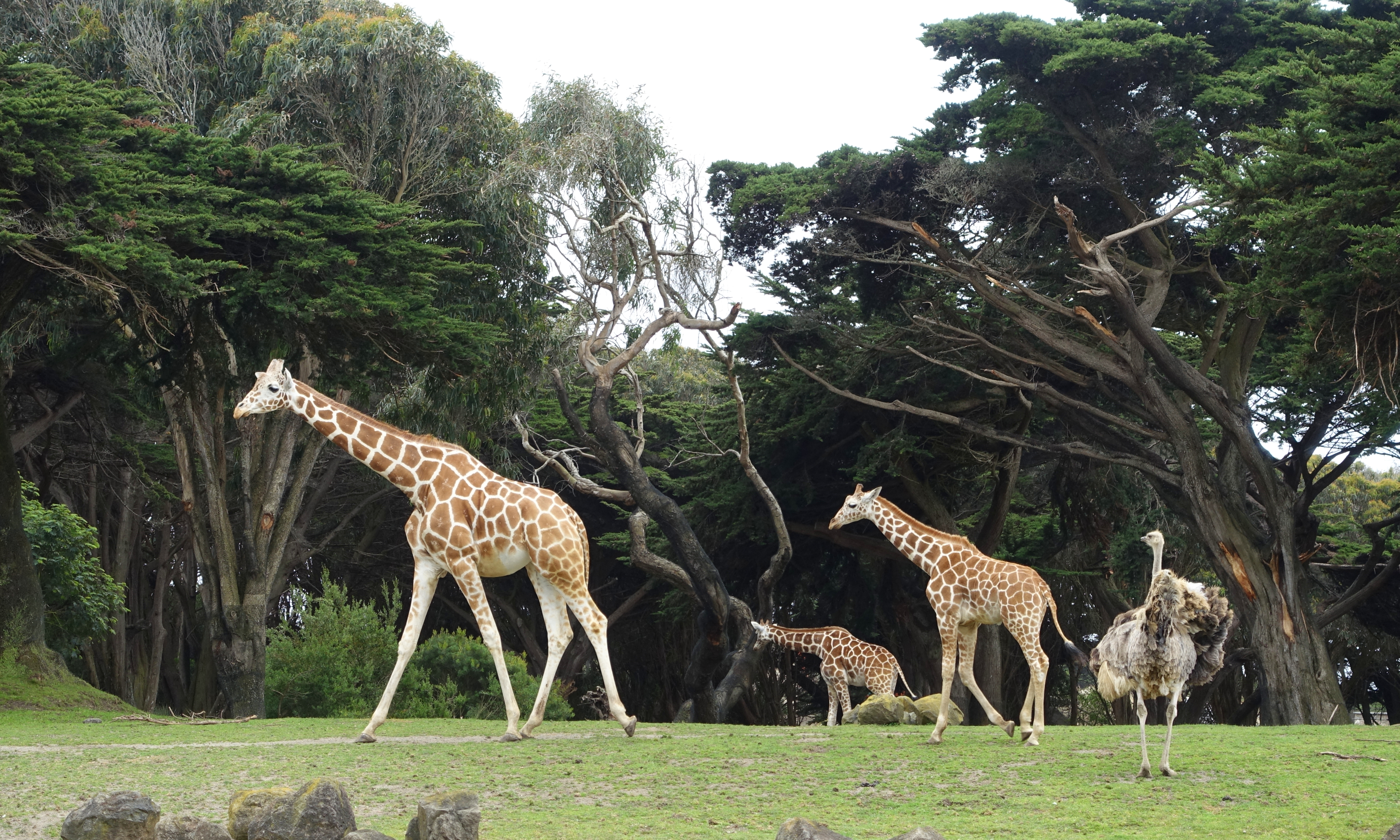
- African Savannah
- Interactive map of San Francisco Zoo
- 37°43′59″N 122°30′11″W
- Location: San Francisco, California
- Land area: 100 acres (40 ha)
- No. of animals: 1000+ (2015)
- No. of species: 250+ (2015)
- Annual visitors: 200,000+
- Memberships: AZA
- Major exhibits: African Savanna, Gorilla Preserve, Grizzly Gulch, Primate Discovery Center (Lemur Forest), Pacific Rim, Penguin Island, Red Panda Treehouse, Insect Zoo
- Public transit: 46th and Wawona; Bus: 18, 23
- Website: www.sfzoo.org

The San Francisco Zoo and Gardens is a 100-acre (40 ha) zoo located on the West Side of San Francisco, in the southwestern corner of the city between Lake Merced and the Pacific Ocean along the Great Highway. The zoo's main entrance (one located on the north side across Sloat Boulevard and one block south of the Muni Metro L Taraval line) is to the west, on the ocean side. The SF Zoo is owned by the San Francisco Recreation & Parks Department, and managed by the San Francisco Zoological Society, a non-profit 501(c)(3) organization. under a public-private partnership since 1993, receives $4.2 million annually from the city.

As of 2016, the zoo housed more than one thousand individual animals, representing more than 250 species. It is noted as the birthplace of Koko the gorilla, and, from 1974 to 2016, the home of Elly, the oldest black rhinoceros in North America. In April 2025, the zoo earned the distinction of being ranked the 6th best zoo in the United States.

== History ==
It was originally named the Fleishhacker Zoo after its founder, banker and San Francisco Parks Commission president Herbert Fleishhacker. Planning for construction began in 1929, on the site adjacent to what was once the largest swimming pool in the United States, the Fleishhacker Pool. The area was also already home to a children’s zoo and playground, an original (circa 1921) Michael Dentzel/Marcus Illions carousel, and the Mother’s Building, a lounge for women and their children. Most of the exhibits were populated with animals transferred from Golden Gate Park, including two zebras, a cape buffalo, five rhesus monkeys, two spider monkeys, and three elephants (Virginia, Marjorie, and Babe).

In the 1930s, the first exhibits built cost $3.5 million, which included Monkey Island, Lion House, Elephant House, a small mammal grotto, an aviary, and bear grottos. These spacious, ha-haed enclosures were among the first bar-less exhibits in the country.

In 1955, The San Francisco News launched a nationwide fund-raising campaign, "The News Elephant Fund" and children around the country sent in small change, even Ed Sullivan contributed, then purchased a baby female Asian elephant, named Pennie, for the pennies donated to buy her. In October 1990, zoo officials announced an elephant exhibit renovation. In 1995, Pennie was euthanized.

Over the next 40 years, the Zoological Society became a powerful fundraising source for the San Francisco Zoo, just as Fleishhacker had hoped when he envisioned: "…a Zoological Society similar to those established in other large cities. The Zoological Society will aid the Parks Commission in the acquisition of rare animals and in the operation of the zoo." True to its charter, the Society immediately exerted its influence on the zoo, obtaining more than 1,300 annual memberships in its first ten years (nearly 25,000 today). It also funded projects like the renovation of the Children’s Zoo in 1964, development of the African Scene in 1967, the purchase of medical equipment for the new zoo Hospital in 1975, and the establishment of the Avian Conservation Center in 1978.

In November 2004, Tinkerbelle, San Francisco Zoo's last Asian elephant, was moved to ARK 2000, a sanctuary run by PAWS-Performing Animal Welfare Society located in the Sierra Nevada foothills. She was later joined in March 2005 by the African elephant Lulu, the last elephant on display at the zoo, though Tinkerbelle died only one month after Lulu's arrival. Lulu died at the sanctuary in April 2024 aged 58, and was the oldest captive African Elephant in the country at the time. The moves followed the highly publicized deaths of 38-year-old Calle in March 2004, and 43-year-old Maybelle the following month.

In early 2006, the zoo announced its offer to name a soon-to-hatch American bald eagle after comedian Stephen Colbert. The publicity and goodwill garnered from coverage of the event on the Colbert Report was a windfall for the zoo and the city of San Francisco. Stephen Jr. was born on April 17, 2006.

In April 2024, Mayor London Breed announced that San Francisco Zoo would receive giant pandas from China in a signed memorandum of understanding.

=== Exhibit renovations ===
- Otter River (1994) featuring North American river otters
- Feline Conservation Center (1994) houses three species of small cats, including the snow leopard, ocelot, and Malayan fishing cats.
- Spectacled bear exhibit renovation (1994)
- Lion House outdoor enclosures (1994)
- Eagle Island renovation (1995) provides a home for Sureshot, an injured (and non-releasable) bald eagle.
- Australian WalkAbout (1995) new space for red kangaroos and emus
- Flamingo Lake renovation (1995)
- Monkey Island demolition (1995)
- Hippopotamus exhibit renovation (1995)
- Warthog exhibit (1996)
- Billabong (1996)
- Aviary renovation (1996)
- Ring-tailed lemur exhibit renovation (1996)
- Children’s Zoo entrance (1996)
- Kodiak bear exhibit (1996)
- Avian Conservation Center (1997)
- African lion cub exhibit (1997)
- Aye-aye Forest (1997)
- Asian elephant exhibit renovations (1997 and 1999)
- Rainbow Landing (now Lorikeet Landing) (1998)
- Outdoor aviary demolition (1998)
- Restoration of Little Puffer (miniature railroad) (1998)
- Primate Discovery Center terrace exhibit renovation (1998)
- Children’s Zoo renovation (1999)
- Puente al Sur (1999) now houses giant anteaters, mountain tapirs, and capybara.
- Infrastructure replacement (1999)
- Aviary renovation (2000) depicts a South American tropical forest, complete with birds, caiman, and an anaconda.
- Seal pool/bear exhibits (2000)
- Connie and Bob Lurie Education Center (2001)
- Koret Animal Resource Center (2001)
- Expanded Children’s Zoo and Family Farm (2001)
- Wetlands habitat (2001)
- Cassowary Exhibit (2001) features double-wattled cassowaries, one of the world's largest bird species.
- Lipman Family Lemur Forest (2002) houses five species of Madagascan primates in an outdoor forest.
- Friend and Taube Entry Village (2002)
- Leaping Lemur Café (2002)
- Split Mound artwork by McCarren/Fine (2002)
- Bronze lion sculptures by Gwynn Murrill (2002)
- Zoo Street and parking (2002)
- Dentzel Carousel (2002)
- African Savanna (2004) features giraffe, zebra, kudu, ostrich and other African wildlife roaming together in a lush, 3 acre (1 ha) habitat.
- African Savanna Giraffe Feedings (2006)
- Black swan exhibit (2006)
- Binnowee Landing and Feeding (formerly Lorikeet Landing) (2006)
- Kunekune pig exhibit at the Family Farm (formerly the miniature pig exhibit) (2006)
- Hearst Grizzly Gulch exhibit (opened June 14, 2007)
- Big Cat Exhibit Renovations (January 2008)
- Hippopotamus and Black Rhinoceros exhibits (the 2 hippos, Puddles and Cuddles, died in 2007 and 2008 and the replacement hippo, Tucker, was moved to the Cincinnati Zoo in 2021) (2007–2009).
- Little Puffer restoration (2009)
- South American Tropical Rainforest Aviary asbestos removal (2009–2010)
- Fishing cat exhibit (2010)
- Mexican wolf canyon (2016)
- Expanded Snow leopard habitat (2022)

== Conservation ==
Two black bears were rescued as orphans in Alaska. The male was found on the edges of town near Valdez in May 2017 and the female cub was found near Juneau in June 2017. Both cubs were determined by the Alaska Department of Fish and Game to be motherless and were brought to Alaska Zoo and rehabilitated back to health. In 2017, the Alaska Zoo had more orphaned bear cubs than ever before, due to the repeal of bear hunting regulations by the Trump administration, which allowed for the hunting of hibernating bears in their dens. The two bears were brought to the San Francisco Zoo in 2017, and a previously empty habitat was repurposed to host them.

Henry, a 10-year-old blind California sea lion, was found stranded on a beach in Humboldt County in 2010. In 2012, he was brought to the San Francisco Zoo, where he was treated for his blindness.

=== Species survival projects ===
The San Francisco Zoo participates in Species Survival Plans, conservation programs sponsored by the Association of Zoos and Aquariums. The program began in 1981 in North American zoos and aquariums to breed selected species to maintain healthy, self-sustaining, genetically diverse and demographically stable populations. The zoo participates in more than 30 SSP programs, working to conserve species ranging from Madagascan radiated tortoises and reticulated giraffes to black rhinos and gorillas.

== Gallery ==
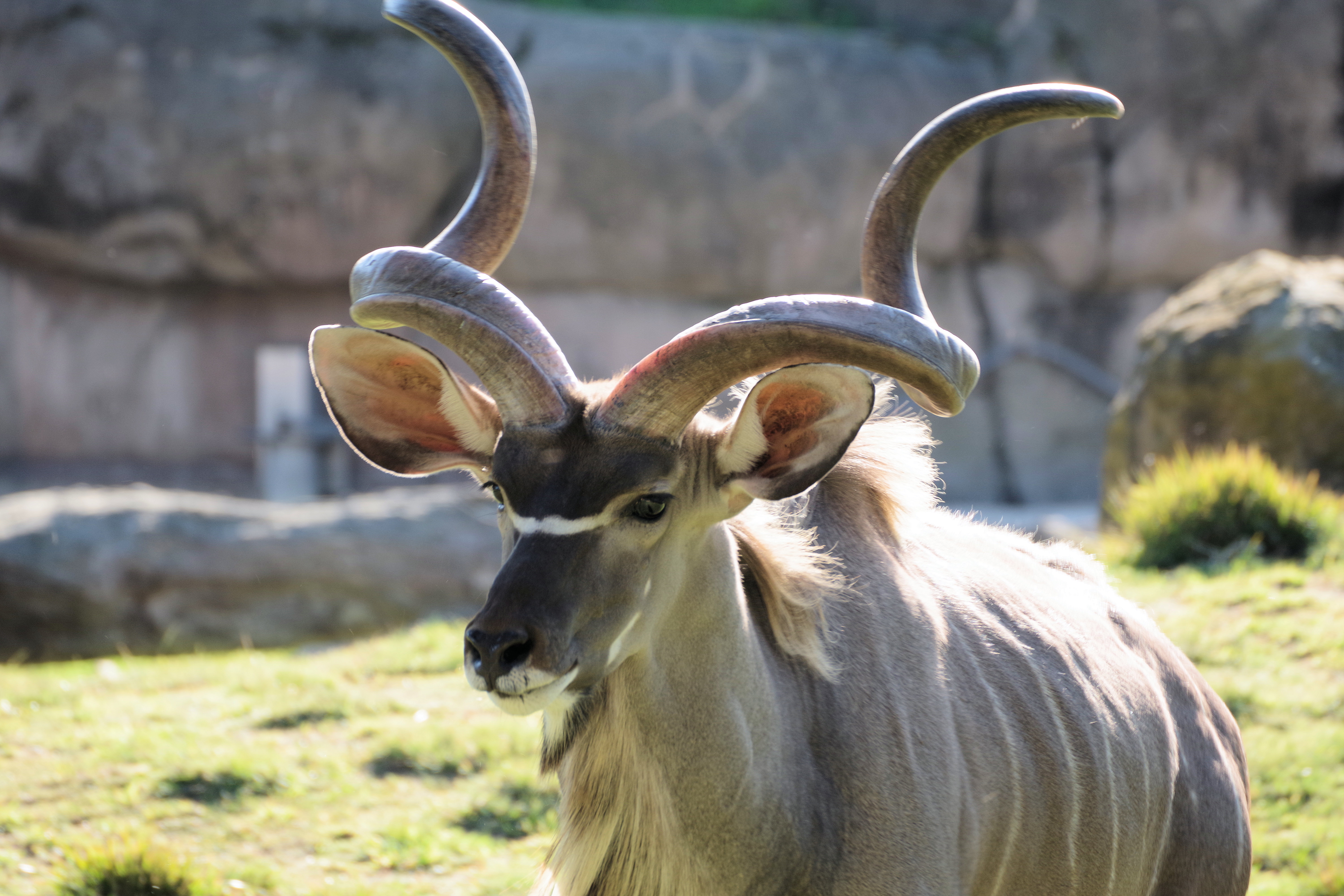
Greater kudu (Tragelaphus strepsiceros).

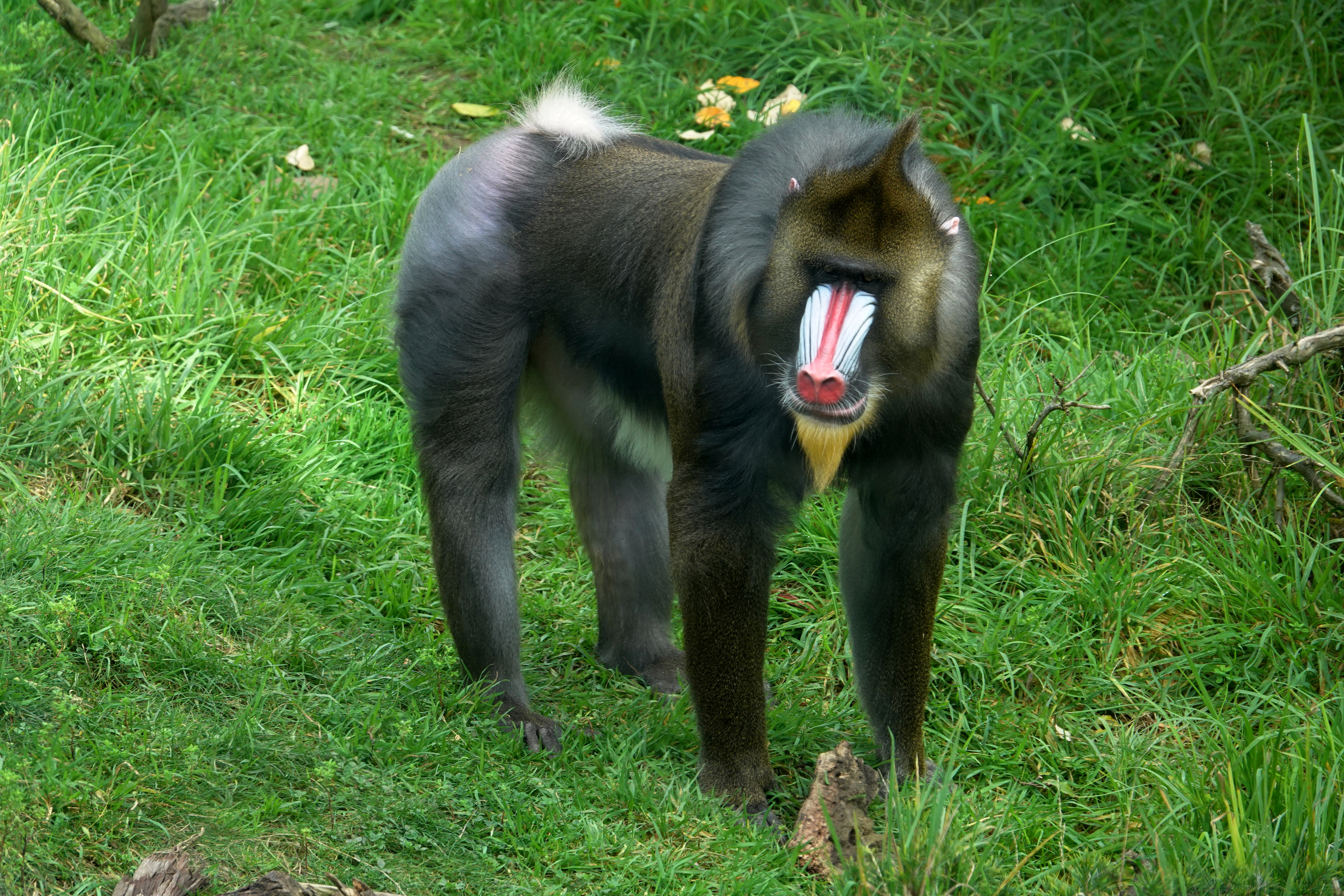
Mandrill.

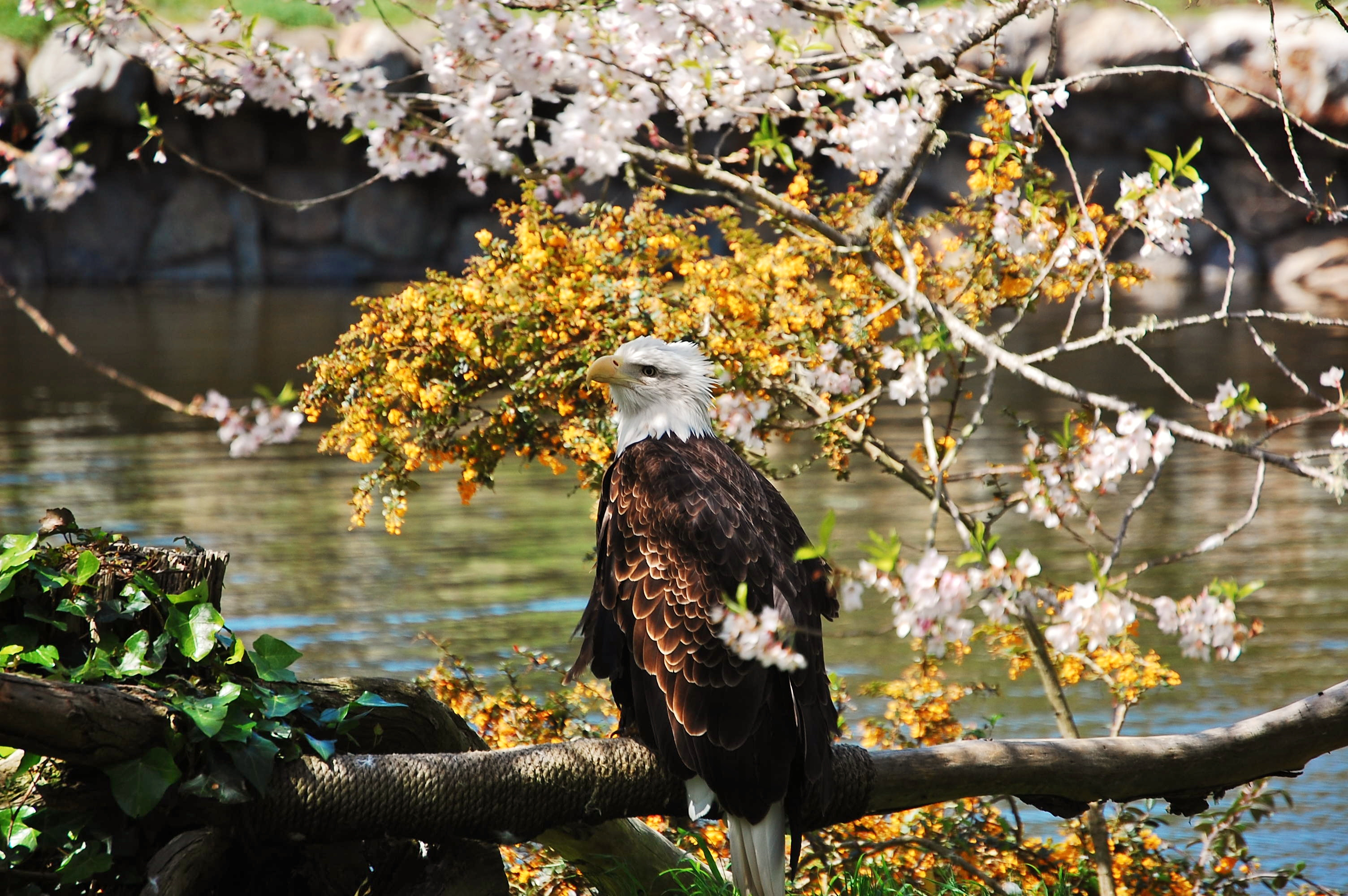
Bald eagle.

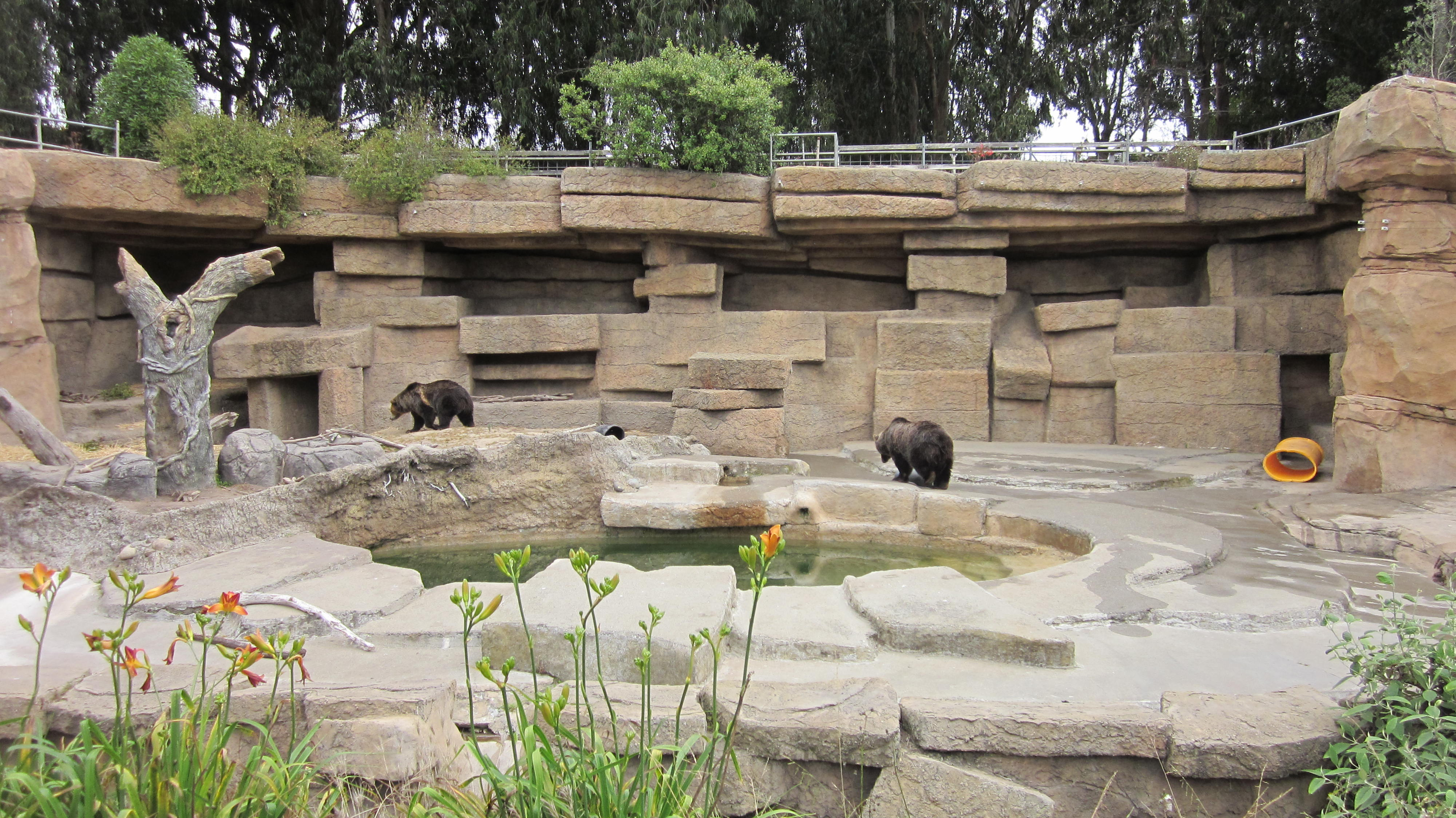
Grizzly bears in Bear Country.

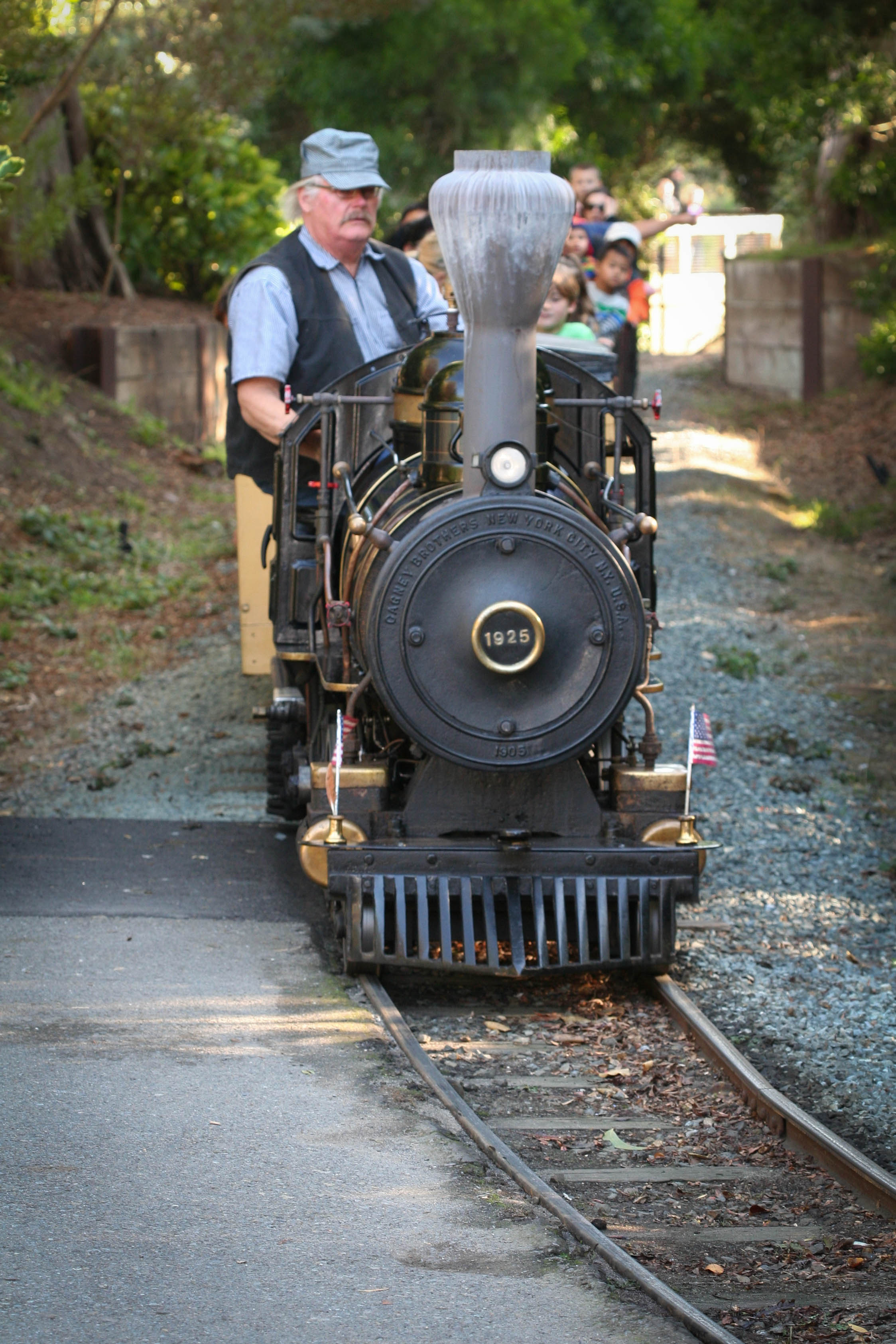
Train.

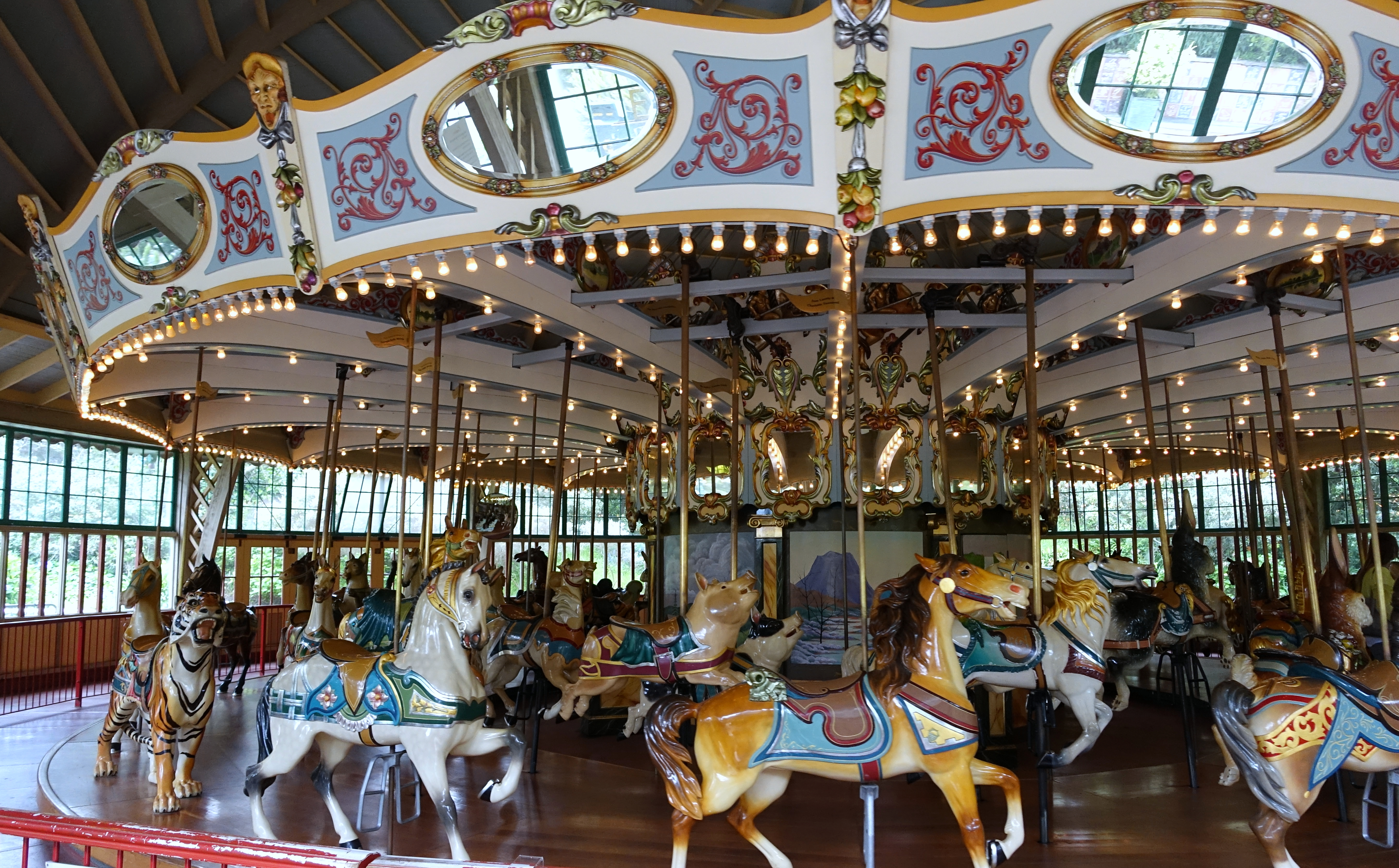
Carousel.

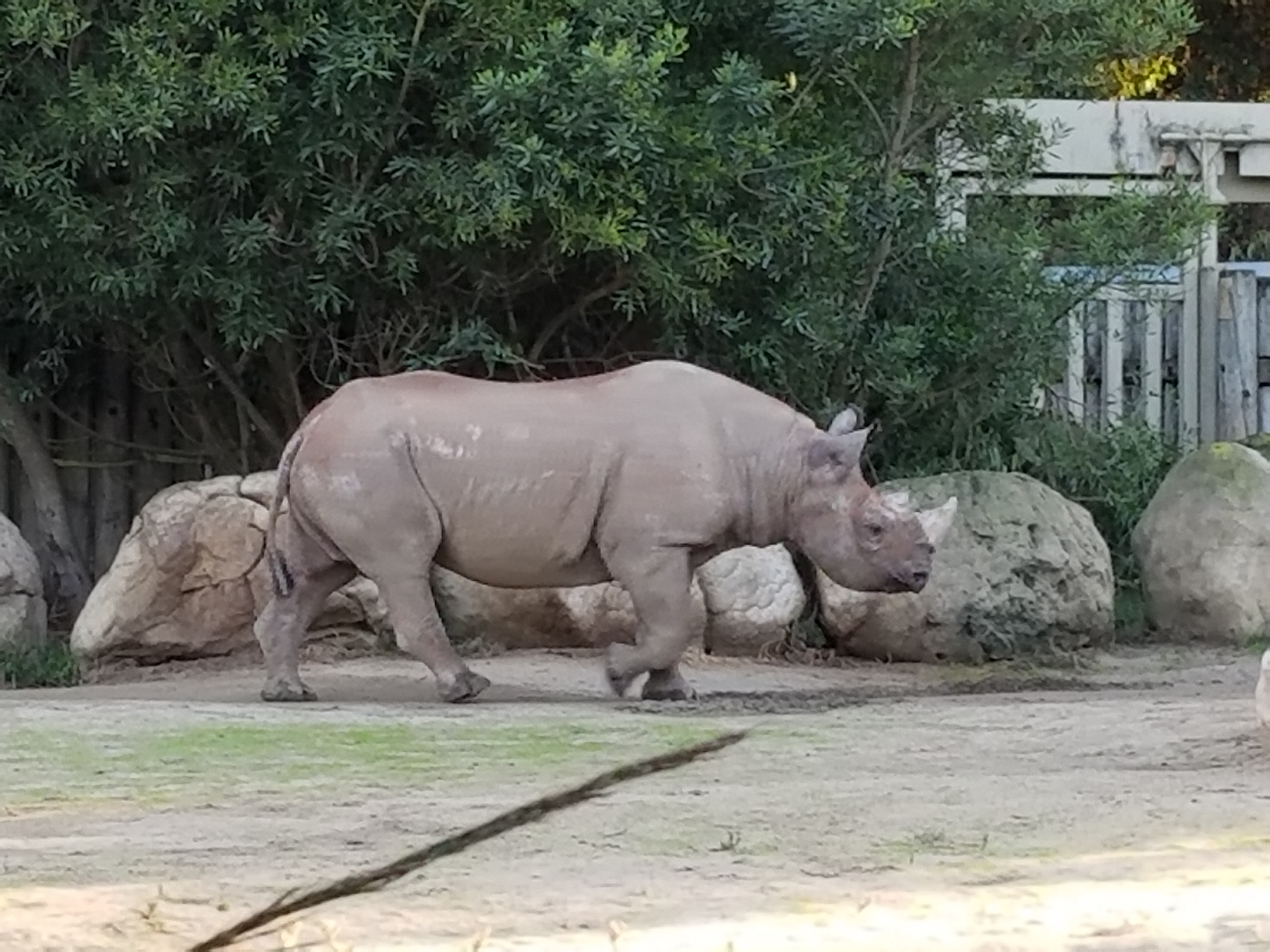
Black Rhino.

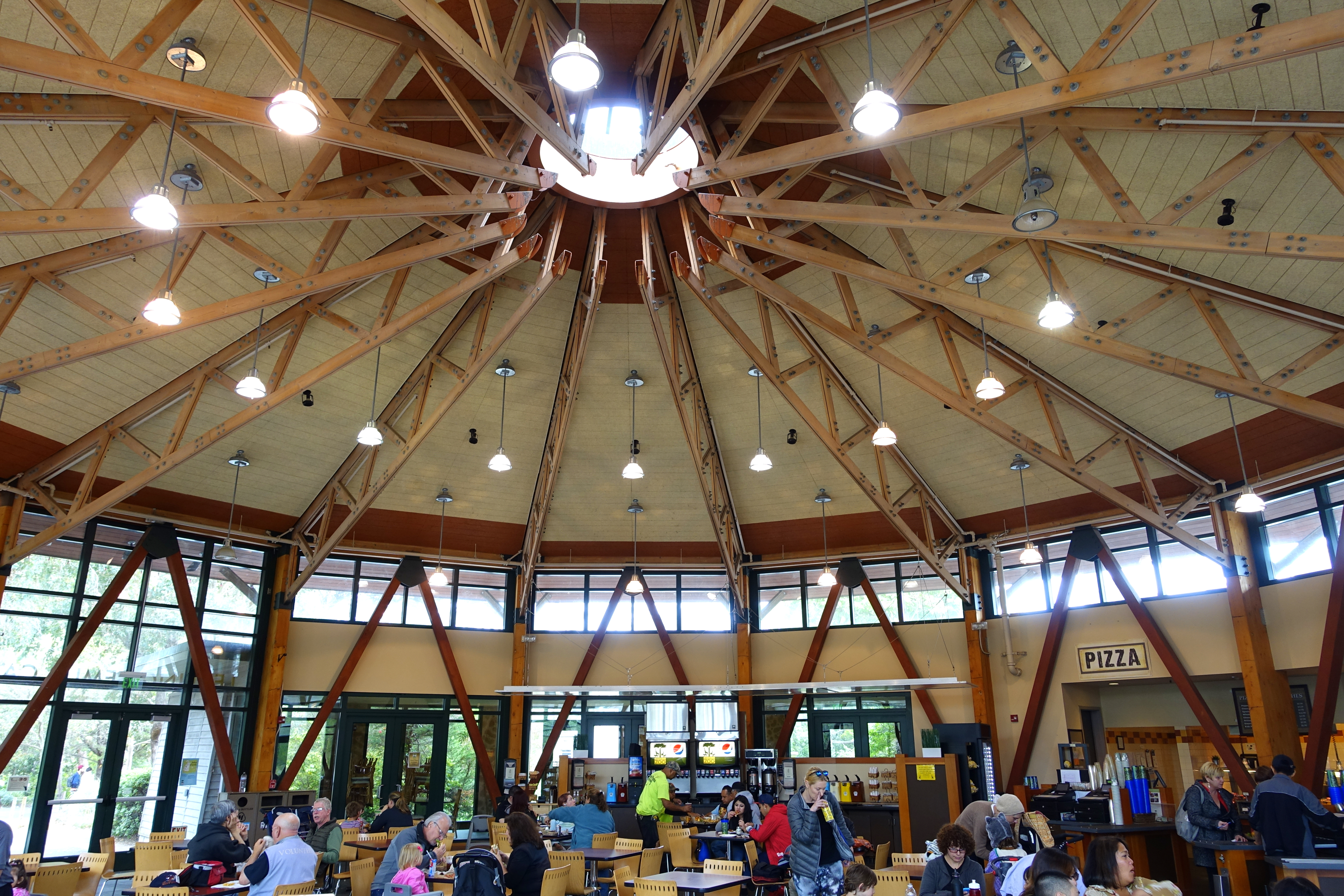
Cafe.

Penguins swimming. (Video)

== Safety incidents, animal deaths, criticism ==
=== City report on safety concerns ===
In October 2024, the San Francisco Animal Control and Welfare Commission released a scathing report on the San Francisco Zoo, describing the 95-year-old facility as "extremely outdated" and "unsafe for visitors and animals." The commission, an advisory body to the city, unanimously supported the report's recommendations, including a call for an audit by the San Francisco Board of Supervisors. The commission found that many of the zoo's enclosures failed to meet basic animal welfare standards, calling the facility "dilapidated" and in need of a comprehensive, strategic redesign. Despite recent inspections from the USDA and the Association of Zoos and Aquariums (AZA) confirming the zoo's compliance with minimum standards, the commission deemed these measures insufficient, highlighting the dangers to both animals and visitors.

The safety concerns raised by this report further intensified scrutiny on the zoo's conditions. Despite a recent internal investigation by the San Francisco Zoological Society affirming CEO Tanya Peterson's position, critics argue that her tenure has been marked by neglect and poor conditions for the animals. High-profile projects, such as a proposed $70 million panda plan, have drawn ire for diverting resources from necessary improvements.

=== Criticism of use of bond funds ===
In 1997, the San Francisco Zoo secured $48 million through a bond measure aimed at revitalizing its facilities, with orangutans and chimpanzees serving as the focal points of the campaign. Despite pledges to overhaul the aging infrastructure and create lush environments like the proposed Great Ape Forest, substantial enhancements remain incomplete decades later. Critics argue that while the zoo focused on enhancing visitor amenities, animal welfare concerns persist, sparking debates over the management of taxpayer funds. Concurrently, the city's Commission of Animal Control and Welfare acknowledged the zoo's efforts to enhance the visitor experience through various bond-funded projects, including the restoration of the zoo carousel, the construction of the animal resource center, and the renovation of the entrance. However, concerns linger over the allocation of funds, particularly regarding the $15 million project combining the new lemur exhibit with facility upgrades.

=== 2007 tiger attacks ===
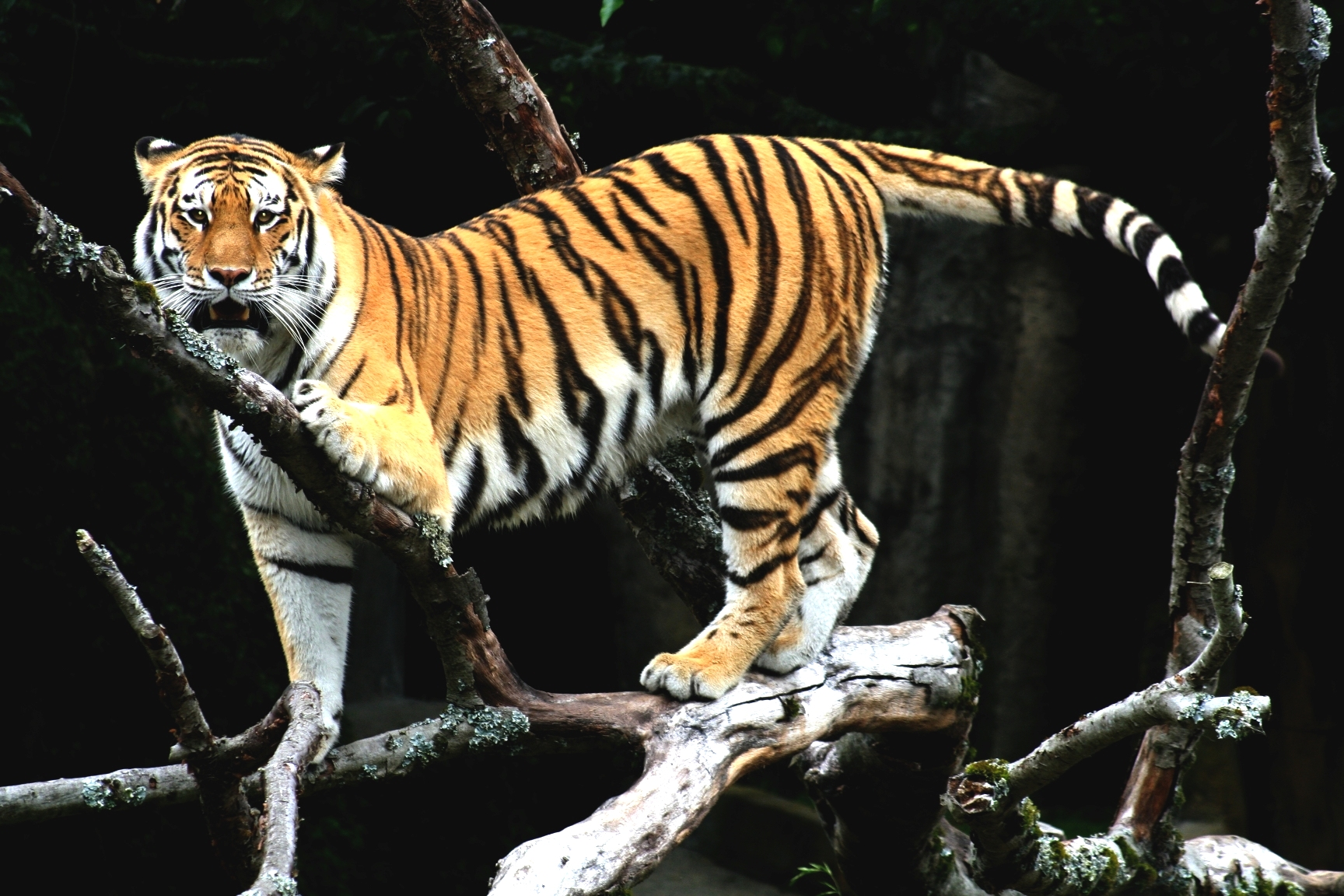
Tatiana, a Siberian tiger that escaped her cage and attacked three people, killing one

On December 22, 2006, Tatiana, the 242-pound Siberian tiger, attacked zookeeper Lori Komejan, who was hospitalized for several weeks with lacerated limbs and shock. The Lion House was closed for ten months as a result. California's Division of Occupation Safety and Health found the zoo liable for the keeper's injuries, fined the zoo, and ordered safety improvements.

On December 25, 2007, the same tiger escaped from her grotto and attacked three zoo visitors after being taunted and pummeled by sticks and pine cones by the visitors. Carlos Sousa, 17, of San Jose, California, was killed at the scene, while another taunter was mauled and survived. The tiger was shot and killed by police while hiding in the landscape after the attack. Three other tigers who shared Tatiana's grotto did not escape. Tatiana arrived at the San Francisco Zoo from the Denver Zoo in 2005, in hopes that she would mate. (This "Tatiana" is not the same as the one successfully breeding in the Toronto Zoo.) According to the Association of Zoos and Aquariums, the attack is the first visitor fatality due to animal escape at a member zoo in the history of the organization.

=== Criticism of director ===
Tanya Peterson, a former lawyer, assumed the role of interim director in June 2008, despite having never taken care of wild animals or managed a nonprofit, maintained her role as CEO and executive director from 2008 to 2025, with an annual salary of $339,500 as of 2022. Peterson faced criticisms of animal care practices, and management decisions including the hiring of her daughter as a paid intern and her fiancé to perform concerts at the zoo. Complaints also arose over Peterson's social media presence, particularly a Facebook photo showing her in close proximity to a seal, contravening federal guidelines. In 2014, members of the zoo’s union then cast a vote of no confidence in Peterson, saying in a letter to the zoo’s board that she "promoted a punitive/retaliatory culture" and "failed to provide proper oversight and senior management accountability on safety issues". In April 2024, 97% of the zoo’s union members cast another vote of no-confidence in Peterson, alleging that Peterson had created a toxic work environment, exacerbated staffing shortages, and neglected safety concerns, including issues with the security of proposed housing for a new jaguar. Peterson subsequently retired in 2025 due to pressure from San Francisco Mayor Daniel Lurie.

=== Theft of squirrel monkey ===
Banana-Sam, a squirrel monkey, was stolen from his cage on December 31, 2011. Vandals broke into the zoo and cut the netting around the squirrel monkey pen, prompting a search by zoo and police officials. Eventually the squirrel monkey was found in a nearby park.

=== Death of gorilla due to door flaw ===
Following the death of Kabibe, a young gorilla crushed by a door in her enclosure at the San Francisco Zoo in November 2014, the facility faced repercussions from the U.S. Department of Agriculture. Despite the zoo's payment of a $1,750 fine, critics, including the International Primate Protection League, deemed the penalty insufficient. The incident occurred during the relocation of gorillas after closing hours, when Kabibe unexpectedly darted under a closing hydraulic door. The zoo's executive director acknowledged breaches in protocol and highlighted routine USDA inspections that previously found no issues with the enclosure. However, expert opinions revealed flaws in the enclosure's design and operational procedures, raising concerns about the safety of both animals and staff.

=== Radio spying controversy ===
In March 2015, zoo employees raised concerns over allegations that management had been using the radios they were required to wear for spying purposes. The issue came to light when employees discovered that their conversations were being picked up by a "hot mic" feature on the radios. While management denied using the radios for spying, a whistleblower claimed that managers were eavesdropping on conversations and even laughing about it.

=== Delay of euthanasia ===
In April 2017 a dispute over the euthanization of a cancer-stricken monkey at the San Francisco Zoo revealed tensions between employees and management regarding animal care. The incident, involving a 15-month-old patas monkey named Bernardo, sparked controversy when zookeepers accused Executive Director Tanya Peterson, with no background in animal care, of delaying euthanasia despite the animal's suffering. Peterson refuted the claims, stating that proper procedures were followed.

=== Mountain lion kills marsupials ===
On June 12, 2020, a kangaroo and two wallaroos were found dead in their enclosure. Zoo officials suspected a local wild carnivore as the culprit. Speculation arose about the involvement of a young mountain lion sighted in the area prior to its capture on Thursday of the same week.

=== Second door incident ===
In August 2018, former zookeeper Trisha Cassianni reported an incident involving a nine-year-old male gorilla named Hasani. While working in the gorilla building, Cassianni heard her coworker shout a warning to Hasani. She observed the ape partially pulling open a hydraulic door. Although keepers managed to distract Hasani and relocate him safely, investigation revealed that the door had malfunctioned due to hydraulic fluid leakage. Records indicated two previous instances of door malfunctions and repairs in the months leading up to the incident. Cassianni expressed concern that had the keepers been in the adjacent space, the situation could have resulted in a catastrophic outcome.

=== Legal and contract violations ===
On June 18, 2019, the Sunshine Ordinance Task Force unanimously found the San Francisco Zoological Society (SFZS) in violation of the San Francisco Sunshine Ordinance and California Public Records Act for its failure to respond to requests for records from Justin Barker, in his efforts to gain insight into the inner workings of the San Francisco Zoo. It was noted that the zoo was also breaching its lease agreement with San Francisco, which mandates public access to operational information. The San Francisco Zoological Society, a non-profit managing the zoo under a public-private partnership since 1993, receives $4.2 million annually from the city.

=== Theft of endangered lemur ===
In October 2020, a 30-year-old man was arrested when he stole an endangered ring-tailed lemur named Maki. He was charged in July 2021 for a violation of the Endangered Species Act. He faced $50,000 in fines and as much as one year in prison. Maki was found the day after he was kidnapped at a playground in Daly City and was returned to the zoo.

=== Treatment of orangutan ===
Former San Francisco Zoo employees Melissa Lory and Trisha Cassianni spoke out about the zoo's treatment of orangutans, expressing concerns about welfare and describing the facility as dysfunctional. Lory, who worked as an orangutan keeper, recounted her experience caring for orangutans Ollie and Amoi, later renamed Berani and Judy, in a 1950s-era primate exhibit lacking sufficient space for natural movement. She noted the inadequate outdoor access and unsuitable conditions, including dark interiors and rat infestations. Cassianni echoed these sentiments, emphasizing the zoo's apparent disregard for animal well-being. Despite improvements eventually made, including the orangutans gaining access to an outdoor yard, concerns persisted among former employees and animal welfare advocates. The zoo, while acknowledging delays in construction and ongoing efforts to enhance habitats, faced criticism for its treatment of animals.

=== Grizzly escape ===
In May 2023, Kiona, the grizzly bear, breached primary containment, venturing into the zookeeper area, where only a gate, a regular door, and a chain-link barrier separated her from the public. Amidst the chaos, a zookeeper swiftly fled for safety, coaxing Kiona into another outdoor habitat before securely locking the doors behind them.

=== Death of penguin due to door ===
In June 2023, an incident occurred involving a one-year-old Magellanic penguin named Handy Harry, who was struck and killed by a guillotine shift door while being secured for pool cleaning. Following safety concerns, the decision was made to relocate the remaining penguins from the otter exhibit to the main penguin colony eight months later.

== See also ==
- Citizens Lobbying for Animals in Zoos
