= Folsom City Zoo Sanctuary =

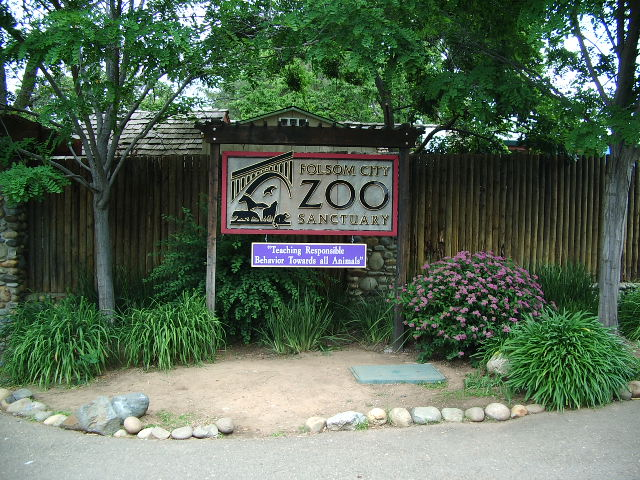
- Sign at the entrance to the Folsom City Zoo Sanctuary
- Interactive map of Folsom City Zoo Sanctuary
- 38.682°N 121.165°W
- Date opened: 1963
- Location: Folsom, California, United States
- No. of animals: ~100
- Website: Official website

The Folsom City Zoo Sanctuary (originally Folsom Zoo) is a zoo and animal sanctuary located in the city of Folsom, California, in the United States, which has been open since 1963. The facility differs from traditional zoos and is more like a sanctuary in the way the animals are acquired and the care they receive. Though the facility allows visitors like a traditional zoo, the animals are not bred, sold, or traded.

The Folsom City Zoo Sanctuary is supported by Friends of the Folsom Zoo, a 501(c)(3) non-profit organization, which helps by providing both funding and volunteers.

== History ==
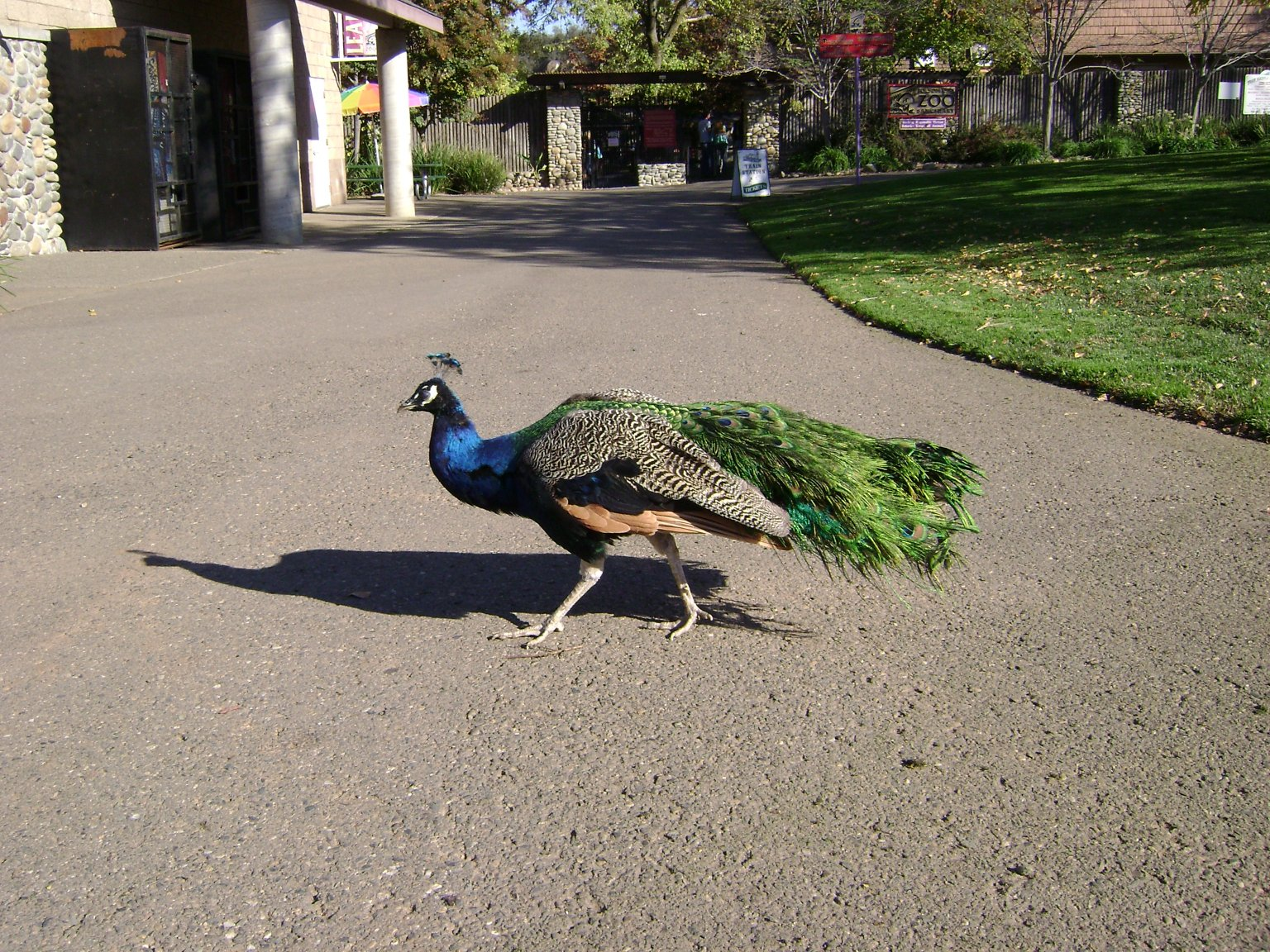
Peacock near the entrance.

The zoo took in its first animal in 1963, when the University of California at Davis Veterinary Department asked the Folsom Park superintendent to add an orphaned bear cub to the few animals he had been keeping around the park office. A cage was built for the bear, Smokey joined the other animals, and the Folsom Zoo was born.

The name was changed to Folsom City Zoo Sanctuary in 2002 to better describe the zoo's goal of taking in animals that cannot be released back to the wild. The animals at the zoo belonged to private parties who either had them seized or relinquished them, wild animals that have injuries that would prevent them from being released back into the wild, and wild animals that have been captured due to their interactions with humans. Once in the zoo, the animals are generally not bred, sold, or traded; but are cared for until they die.

== Animals at the zoo ==
Many, but not all, of the zoo residents are native to North America. Animals at the zoo include bears, tigers, mountain lions, bobcats, foxes, wolves, wolf hybrids, coyote, sheep, mule deer, macaques, squirrel monkeys, raccoons, skunks, eagles, parrots, and ravens.

== Folsom Valley Railway ==
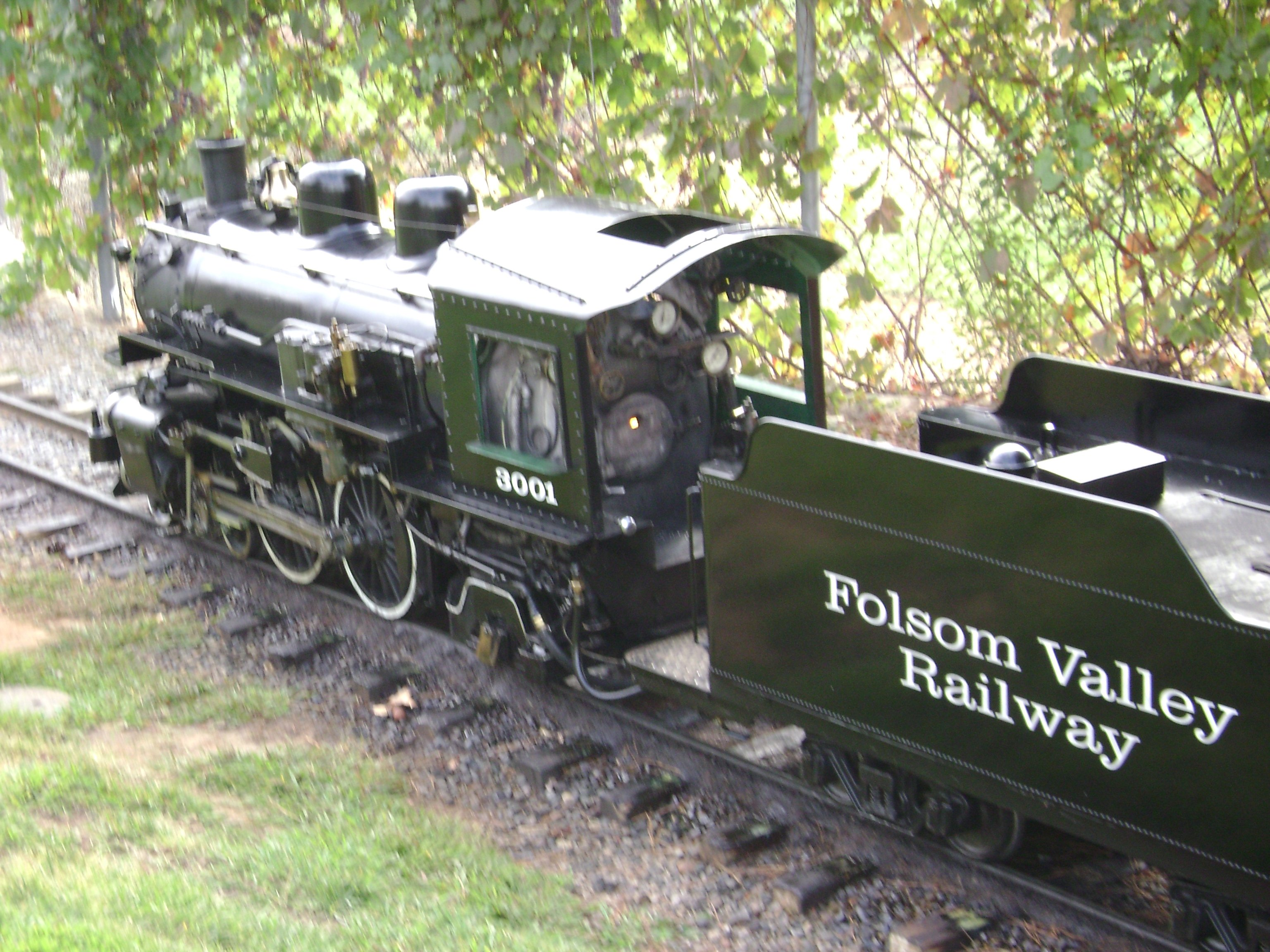
Engine 3001

The Folsom Valley Railway has been in existence at City Lions Park since 1970 and includes 4,020 feet of track around the Folsom Zoo. It is the only 12-inch gauge railroad remaining in the United States and is one of six mini-scale replica steam-powered railroads in public operation in California.

The Folsom Valley Railway was built in 1970 by the Sherman Brothers with the blessing by Mayor Jack Kipp. From there, it was bought and operated by Mylon Thorley. Terry Gold bought the Folsom Valley Railway from Thorley in June 1990 and officially took possession of the train on January 1, 1991. In 2024, Gold handed operations over to Truson Buegel and Stephanie Bea Roy with intentions to retire the following year.

The railway operates two mini-authentic steam engines – one engine is "Cricket" and was built in 1950. "Cricket" ran in Berkeley’s Tilden Park for 20 years; in 1970, the engine was sold to the Sherman Brothers and brought to Folsom, where it has been running since.

The second engine, 3001, was built in 1949 and ran in Sacramento’s William Land Park in 1950 for four months, but the small population there at the time couldn't support a train operation. The engine was sold to a private collector in Seattle but was eventually brought to Sacramento in 2007, where it became one of two engines operating on the Folsom Valley Railway.

Since 2019, Diesel power has been seen on the FVR in the form of a Miniature Train Company G-12.
