= Pittsburgh Zoo & Aquarium =

Zoo and aquarium in Pittsburgh, Pennsylvania, United States

- Interactive map of Pittsburgh Zoo & Aquarium
- 40.484°N 79.918°W
- Date opened: June 14, 1898
- Location: Pittsburgh, Pennsylvania, United States (in Highland Park)
- Land area: 77 acres (31 ha)
- No. of animals: Over 4,000
- No. of species: 475
- Annual visitors: 1+ million
- Major exhibits: Forest Passage, African Savanna, Tropical Forest, The Islands, Jungle Odyssey, Aquarium, Water's Edge, Kid's Kingdom
- Website: www.pittsburghzoo.org

The Pittsburgh Zoo & Aquarium is a zoo and aquarium in the United States, one of only six major zoo and aquarium hybrids in the United States. Located in Pittsburgh, Pennsylvania's Highland Park, the zoo sits on 77 acres (31 ha) of park land where it exhibits more than 4,000 animals representing 475 species, including 20 threatened or endangered species.

First opened in 1898 as the Highland Park Zoo, the zoo evolved from a menagerie to a conservation-focused institution. Pittsburgh saw its zoo grow beginning in the late 1930s when the Works Progress Administration and donations from foundations spearheaded expansions, including then the second largest aquarium in the United States. The zoo was known as the Pittsburgh Zoo and PPG Aquarium from 2002 to 2022, incurred during a 20-year naming rights agreement with PPG Industries. The zoo's accredited membership of the Association of Zoos and Aquariums (AZA) was dropped in 2015, and later regained in 2024.

== History ==
=== Highland Park Zoo ===
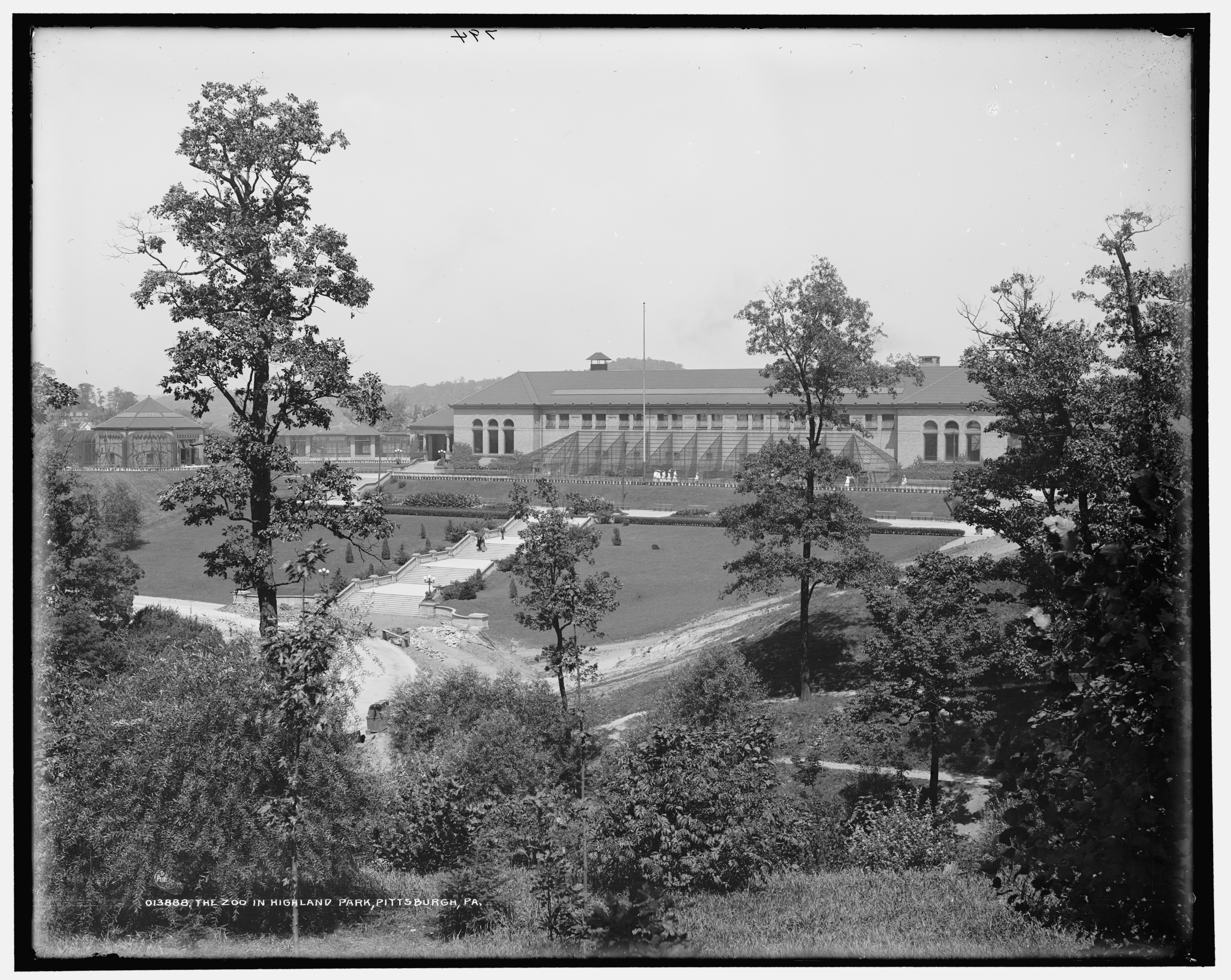
Entrance to the Highland Park Zoo, c. 1900

The Pittsburgh Zoo opened on June 14, 1898, as Highland Park Zoo, after Christopher Lyman Magee donated $125,000 (about four million dollars when adjusted for inflation) for the construction of a zoological garden in Pittsburgh's Highland Park.

Like most other zoos of the time, the Pittsburgh Zoo more closely resembled a menagerie than an actual zoo. However, as time progressed, the animal exhibits eventually became more naturalistic, and the zoo's goal became more focused on conservation.

=== Expansion under the Works Progress Administration ===
In 1937, the bear exhibits and the main building of the zoo were built under the Works Progress Administration. These exhibits were the zoo's first attempt at constructing more naturalistic exhibits instead of simply displaying animals in cages. In 1949, the Children's Zoo opened with a grant from the Sarah Mellon Scaife Foundation. The Children's Zoo contained interactive exhibits and play areas for children, including a simulated large chunk of cheese that was inhabited by dozens of live mice. In 1967, the AquaZoo, a large aquarium, opened to the public. At the time of its completion, the AquaZoo was the only aquarium in Pennsylvania and the second largest aquarium in the United States.

=== Master plan ===
In 1980, the zoo's Master Plan was put into effect. This plan called for extensive renovations and the construction of more naturalistic exhibits. The Asian Forest, which opened in 1983, was the first area of the zoo that utilized this new philosophy of naturalistic exhibits. The African Savanna was the next area to obtain naturalistic exhibits when it was completed in 1987. 1991 marked the opening of the Tropical Forest, a five-acre indoor rain forest showcasing about 16 species of primate and 150 tropical plant species. That same year, the Children's Zoo was renovated and renamed the Children's Farm. Three petting zoos were built in Children's Farm where children could pet kangaroos, deer, and domesticated animals such as sheep and goats. By 1996, the Children's Farm was replaced by a new exhibit, Kids Kingdom.

In 1994, the Pittsburgh Zoo became a private nonprofit organization, still owned by the City of Pittsburgh, but managed and operated by the Zoological Society of Pittsburgh. That same year, the Education Complex was built. This new building contained five classrooms, a library, and a 300-seat lecture hall. The construction of this building was an important part of the zoo's history because it signified the zoo's dedication to conservation and education.

=== Present history and expansions ===
In 2000, the AquaZoo underwent a $17.4 million renovation, and was renamed the PPG Aquarium. This new aquarium is twice the size of the original AquaZoo. In 2002, the Education Complex was expanded to include a second story, providing more classrooms, teacher resource areas, and an animal holding area. This expansion was made possible by the Scaife Charitable Foundation and by donations from senator Rick Santorum.

On November 19, 2002, elephant keeper Mike Gatti was killed by one of the zoo's elephants. Gatti, 46, was killed while attempting to encourage the elephant to move to a different part of her enclosure. She butted him with her head, crushing him against the ground and killing him instantly. This was the first instance of a human fatality at the zoo, although there had been injuries.

In 2006, the Pittsburgh Zoo completed Water's Edge, a marine exhibit that allows guests to have close encounters with polar bears, sea otters, and sand tiger sharks.

On November 4, 2012, a two-year-old boy, Maddox Derkosh, who had been sitting on the railing of the African wild dog exhibit, fell off the railing, bounced off protective netting, and fell into the enclosure, resulting in his death. The medical examiner subsequently determined that Maddox was killed by the 11 dogs that attacked him, not by the fall. Zookeepers immediately rushed to the area, firing darts to try and scare the dogs off, and police shot one particularly aggressive dog, which had refused to retreat from the exhibit when called. The other dogs were quarantined for thirty days but there were no plans to put them down. The prosecutor, Allegheny County, Pennsylvania District Attorney Stephen Zappala, calling the incident a "tragic accident", has stated he will not charge Maddox's mother, Elizabeth Derkosh, 34, who had lifted the visually impaired boy up on top of the railing to get a better view. He is still investigating whether the zoo is at fault due to any possible negligence. Since the incident, the zoo replaced the wild dogs with cheetahs. As a result of his death, Trucks for Maddox was created, to donate Maddox's toy trucks to children. It was also the second human fatality at the zoo.

A brand new master plan was released in 2023 to bring several areas that were built in the 70s and 80s and early 90s up to modern standards starting with a brand new giraffe barn a expansion area taking over an undeveloped area of the zoo for Indonesia

== Exhibits ==
The Pittsburgh Zoo is divided into eight sections, each of which focuses on a particular theme.

=== Kid's Kingdom ===
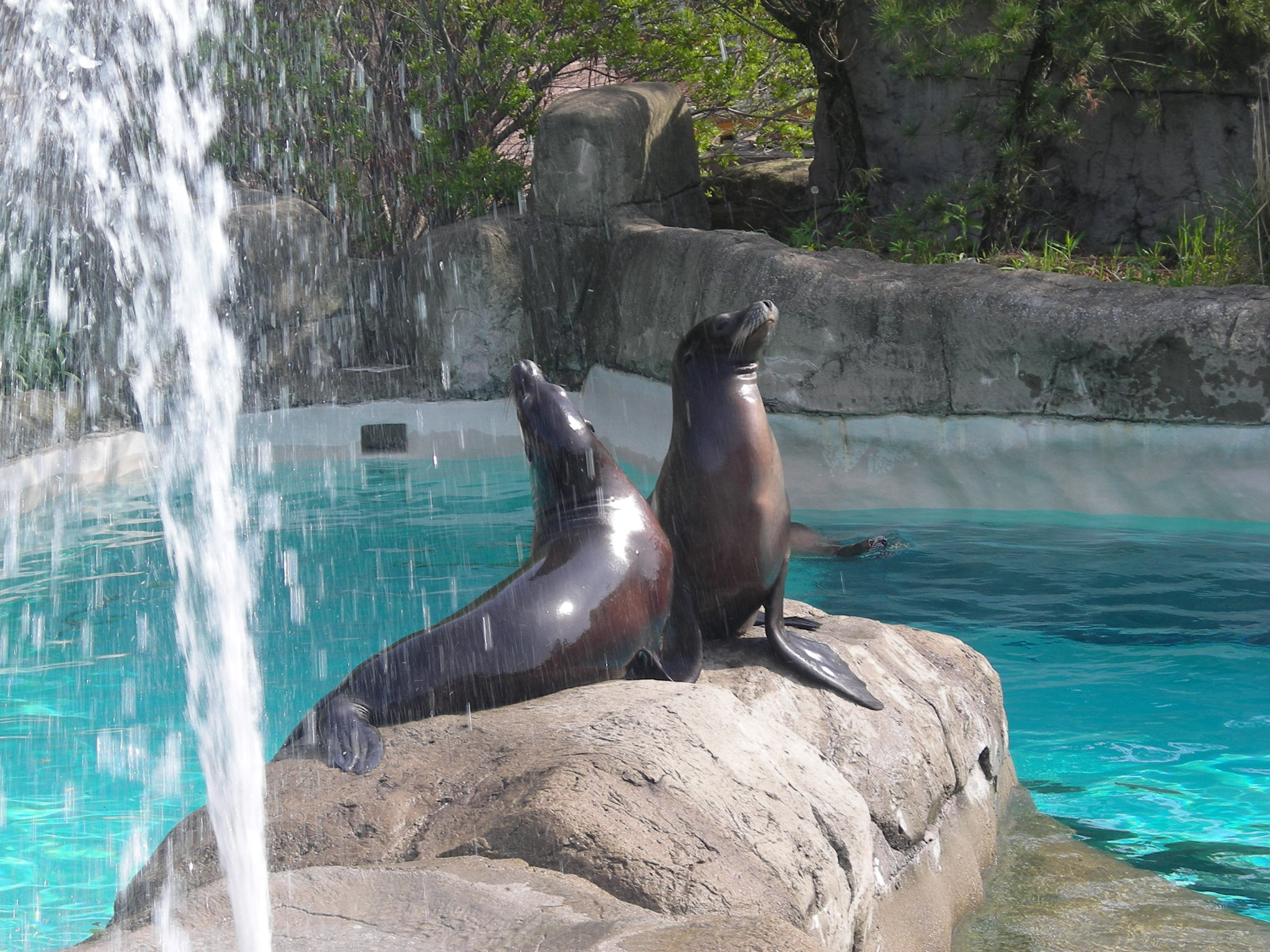
The sea lion exhibit in the Kids Kingdom section of the Pittsburgh Zoo

Kid's Kingdom opened in 1949, when it was then simply called Children's Zoo. In 1994 a naming contest was implemented for a new name to the newly expanded area, the name was from winner Adam Mellinger from Westmoreland County, Pennsylvania. This section of the zoo is an interactive children's area, and contains a petting zoo stocked with domesticated animals; a reptile house; a playground; and several exhibits featuring wildlife from Pennsylvania, including white-tailed deer, North American beavers, river otters and barn owls the sea Lion exhibit was recently taken over by the species of African penguins

Kid's Kingdom contains many interactive exhibits, such as the meerkat exhibit, which contains crawl-through tunnels that gives the viewer an idea of what it is like to be a meerkat or other burrowing animal as well as a walk-through red kangaroo pen. The animal yards and habitats in Kids Kingdom allow visitors to learn about animals' lives, behaviors, and points-of-view. Kid's Kingdom has been highly ranked by both Parent Magazine and America's Best Zoos Travel Guide. Kid's Kingdom also has Naked mole-rats.

=== Aquarium ===
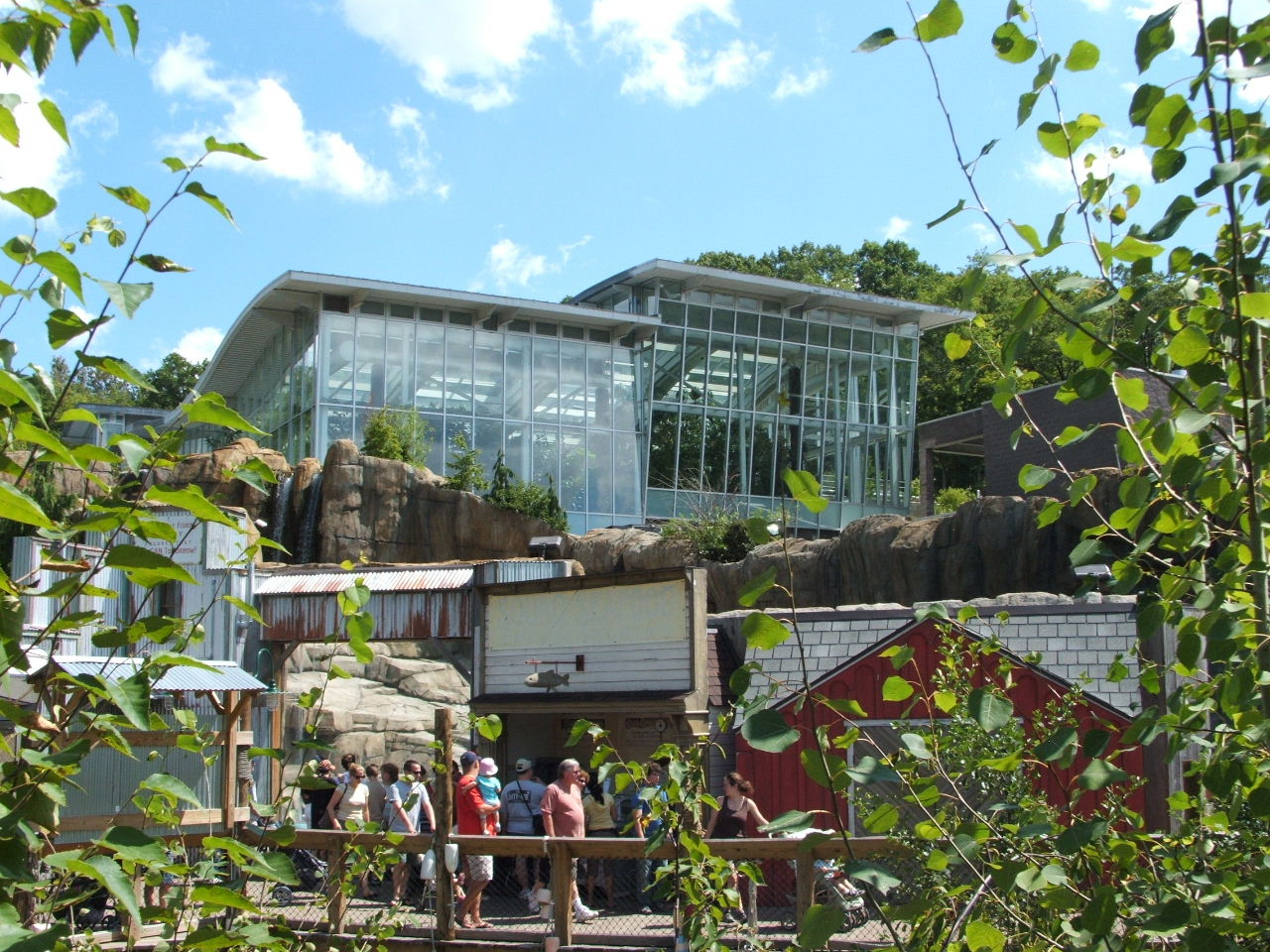
The Aquarium at the Pittsburgh Zoo

Built in 1967 (then called AquaZoo) and renovated in 2000, the Aquarium is a 45,000 square foot, two-story aquarium that presents several aquatic habitats. The aquarium's theme is the "Diversity of Water", and contains several exhibits that portray different marine ecosystems, including a tropical rainforest gallery; a Pennsylvania exhibit, which features fish and aquatic wildlife of the Allegheny River; a penguin exhibit, which is inhabited by kings, macaronis, and gentoos; a coral reef; and an open ocean exhibit.

The aquarium was one of the few facilities in the U.S. to hold Amazon river dolphins in captivity. When the AquaZoo opened in October 1967, it included a baby river dolphin named Pinky. However, Pinky died twelve days after its opening from an eye infection. In 1970, seven river dolphins arrived, but only one of the river dolphins, a male named Chuckles, survived. Chuckles became the longest-living captive river dolphin, and by the 1980s, became the only river dolphin kept in captivity at North America. He performed tricks, interacted with visitors, and his trainers would swim with him occasionally. When the aquarium was renovated in 2000, Chuckles was transferred to a customized pool five times the size of his previous home. He died at the elderly age of 34 years old on February 20, 2002. A portrait commemorating him can be found at the Aquarium.

In 2002, PPG Industries announced its intention to sponsor the zoo and purchase the naming rights for 20 years, naming the facility the "Pittsburgh Zoo and PPG Aquarium". Upon expiration of the naming rights in 2022, the zoo reverted its name to "Pittsburgh Zoo and Aquarium".

=== Forest Passage ===
Forest Passage (formerly Asian Forest) contains several species from Eastern and Southeast Asia, and simulates a journey from the Himalayas to Indonesia. This section features some of the most critically endangered big cats of Asia, including Siberian tigers and Amur leopards, as well as several other Asian animals, such as Komodo dragons and red pandas. This section, opened in 1983, is the result of the zoo's Master Plan of 1980, which was dedicated to create more naturalistic exhibits than what existed at the time.

In January 2017, the Pittsburgh Zoo's only snow leopard, Chaney, died of cancer at 17. Since then, the zoo has displayed two Canada lynxes in the former snow leopard exhibit. In late 2018, several cubs were born to the pair, resulting in a larger family of Lynx. This change has prompted the zoo to rename Asian Forest to Forest Passage in light of the inclusion of a non-Asian animal.

=== Tropical Forest ===
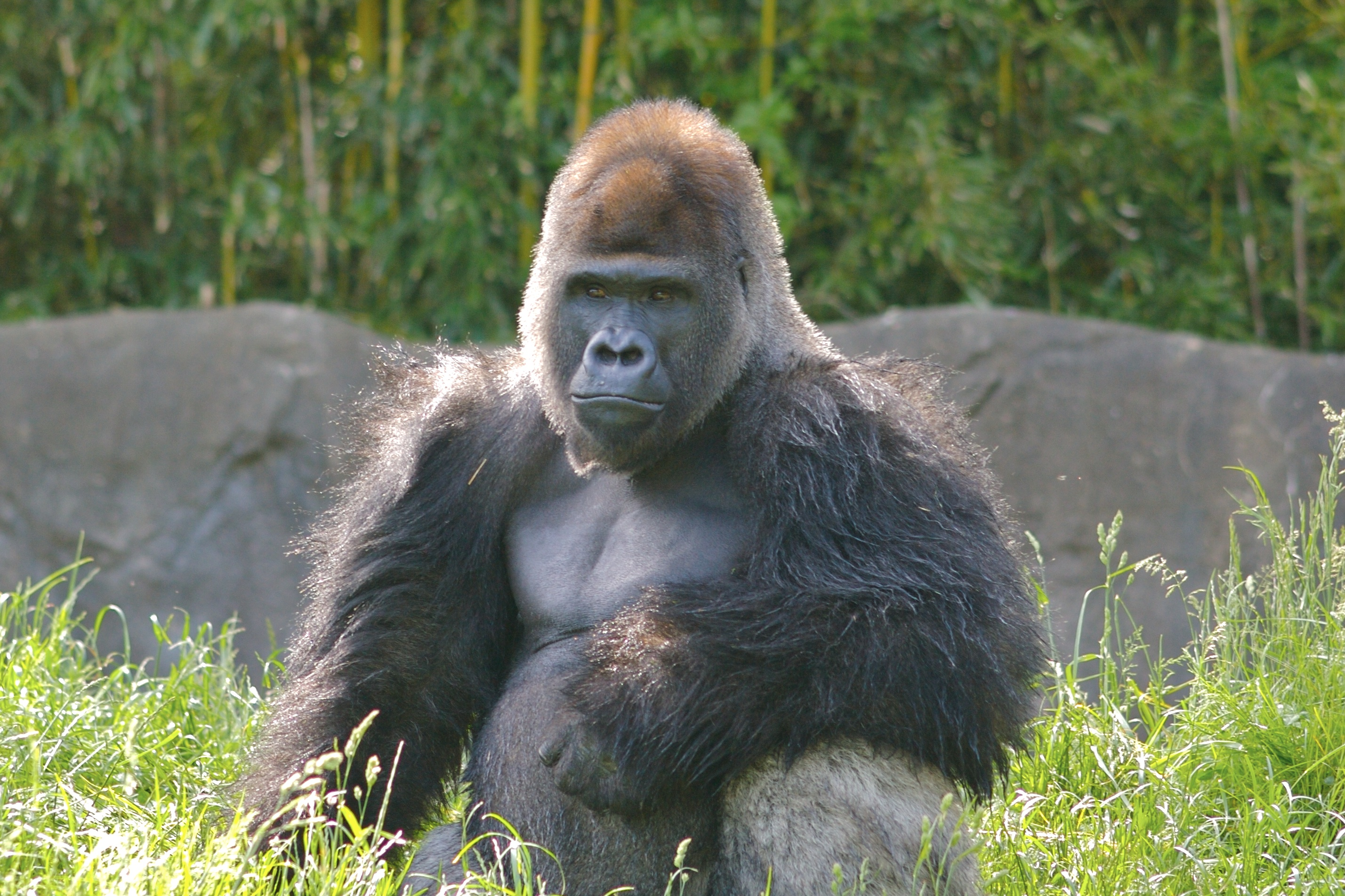
Silverback gorilla

The Tropical Forest, which opened in 1991, is a 0.5-acre indoor rainforest. This building focuses mostly on primates, containing 16 species in total. Ring-tailed lemurs, black-and-white ruffed lemurs, red ruffed lemurs, tufted capuchins, white-faced sakis, black howler monkeys, northern white-cheeked gibbons, Angola colobuses, blue monkeys, and great apes, including western lowland gorillas and Bornean orangutans all live in this building. Some other rainforest animals are displayed here as well, such as Hoffmann's two-toed sloths.

=== African Savanna ===
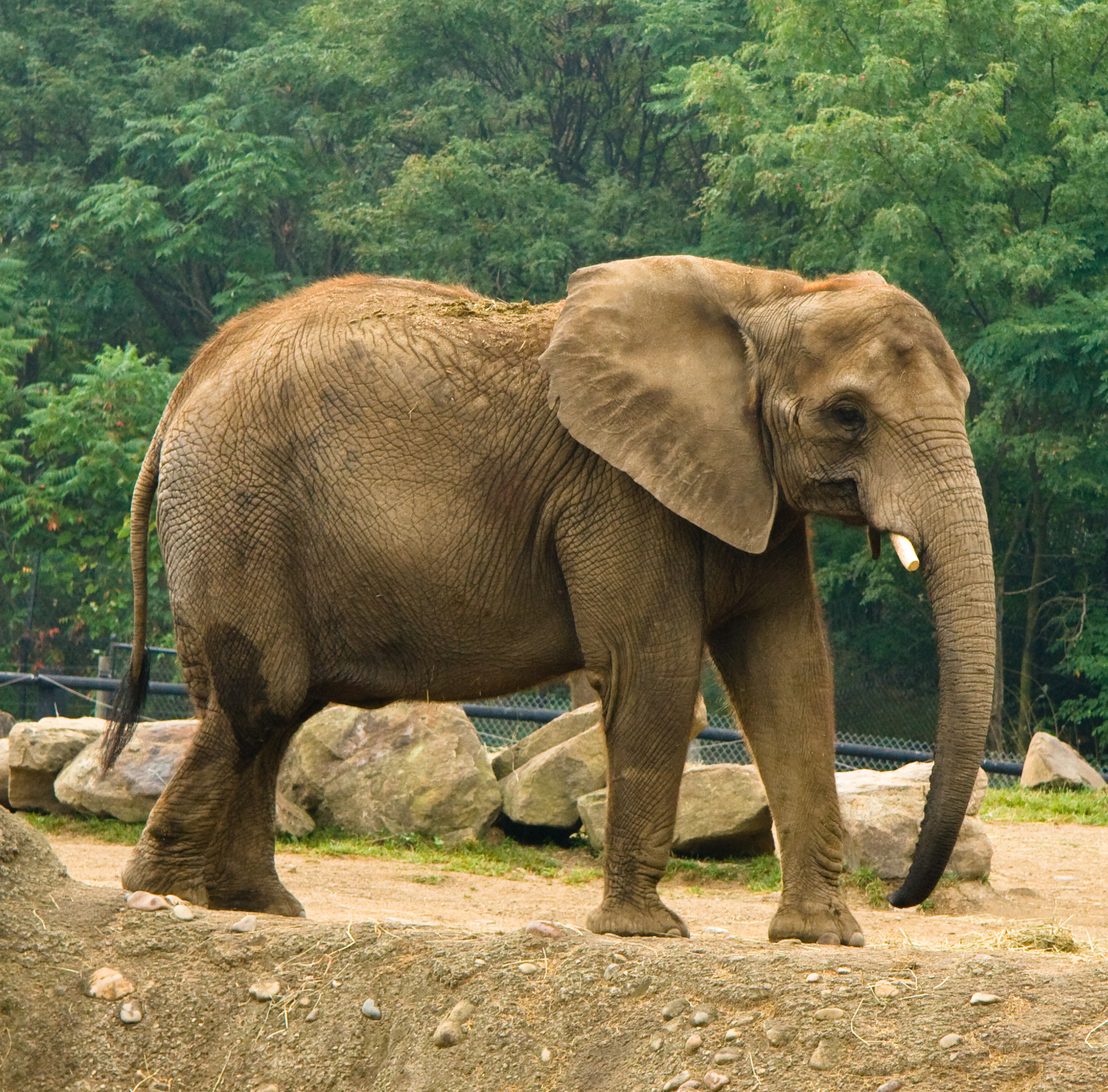
African bush elephant (Loxodonta africana) at the zoo

Like the Asian Forest, the African Savanna is also a result of the zoo's Master Plan of 1980. Completed in 1987, this section of the zoo is modeled to give the viewer the impression that he or she is walking along a river in an African savanna. This section of the zoo contains lions, African bush elephants, Masai giraffes, Grant's zebras, eastern black rhinos, American flamingos, common ostriches, nyalas, dwarf crocodiles and Galápagos tortoises.

Cheetah Valley is part of the African Savanna. It was originally housed a pack of African wild dogs, but they were removed because of the incident on November 4, 2012 in order to ensure the safety of the visitors. This exhibit now features cheetahs. Visitors can view them from a glass panel. The former observation platform was permanently replaced by tall protective welded fences and shrubbery. in

=== Bears ===
The three bear exhibits were built in 1937 under the Works Progress Administration program, and are the oldest exhibits in the zoo. Three bear species were displayed here: American black bears, spectacled bears, and a Kodiak bear.

In August 2010, the Pittsburgh Zoo announced that their 28-year-old Kodiak bear, Rocky, died. Rocky was suffering from severe arthritis in the joints between his vertebrae, causing severe pain and limited mobility. Although the veterinary staff attempted to alleviate Rocky's pain, his quality of life continued to rapidly decline, and he had to be humanely euthanized. As of August 2010, his exhibit is empty.

The bear exhibits are currently empty. Plans exist to construct new bear exhibits, while the old ones are being used as part of zoo expansion and construction. The area around this area has been sealed off and a new path leading to the aquarium is now used in the old path is now staff only

=== Water's Edge ===
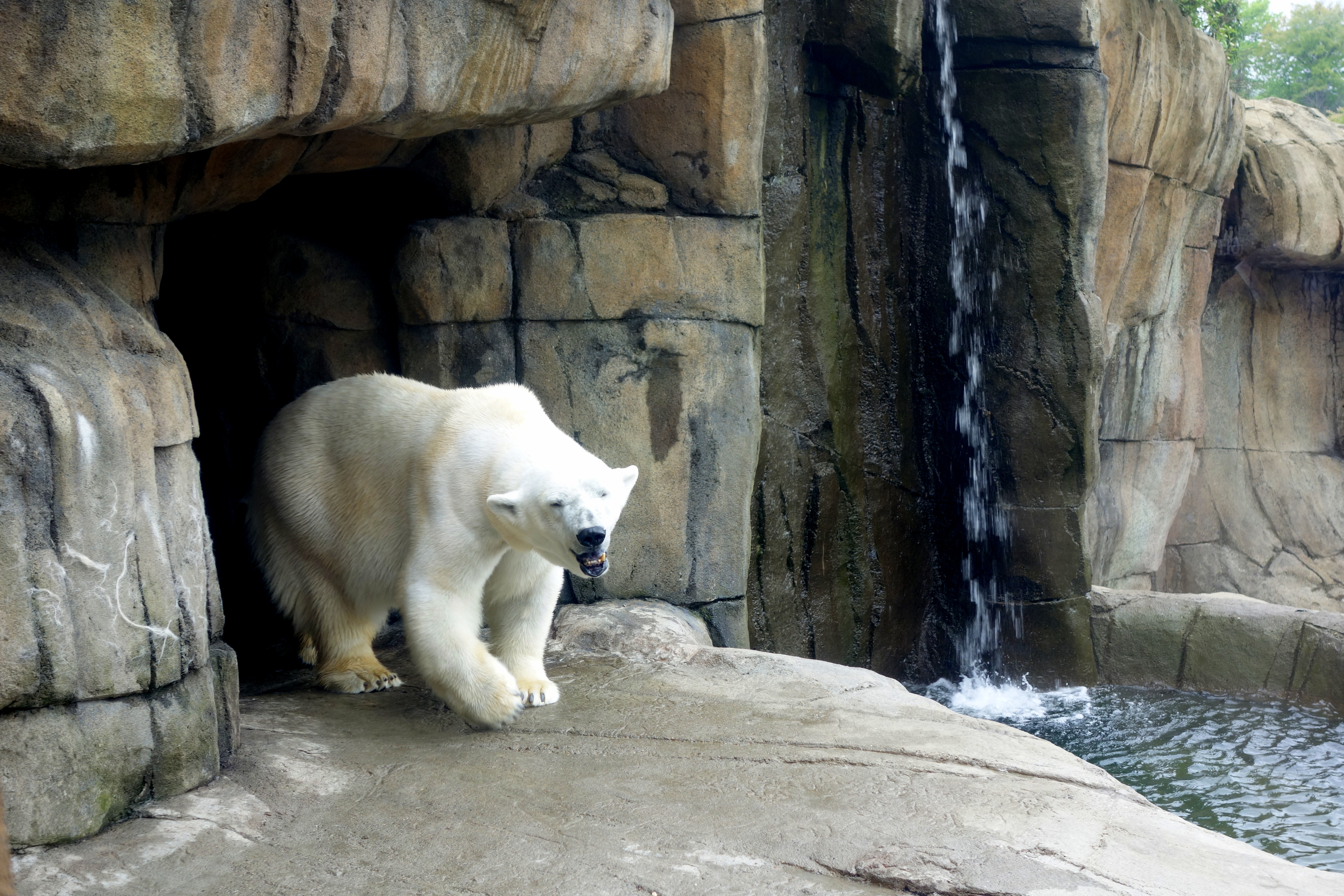
A polar bear taking a stroll at the zoo

Completed in 2006, Water's Edge is a newer section of the zoo, and is located adjacent to the aquarium. This section is constructed to resemble a coastal fishing village, and illustrates the ways that humans interact with marine wildlife in coastal areas. A long walk-through tunnel runs through three large water tanks containing polar bears, sea otters, two female northern elephant seals and sea lions.

According to Barbara Baker, the elephant seal exhibit was originally intended for walruses, but walruses were difficult to obtain. Five sand tiger sharks were housed in the enclosure from until 2016 when they were moved to Neptune Park in Florida. A blind elephant seal, named Coolio was rescued by the Northcoast Marine Mammal Center and arrived at the zoo early in 2014. As of 2020, two rescued females named Ellie Mae and Nessie have also been brought in. Coolio died in December 2019 during a veterinary procedure.

=== The Islands ===
Opened in June 2015, The Islands exhibit is a 22,000 square foot exhibit featuring several endangered animals including tomistomas, Philippine crocodiles, Aldabra giant tortoises, Visayan warty pigs, clouded leopards and siamangs. The exhibit has scenery intended to provide the atmosphere of a tropical island, and includes a large area of sand with beach chairs and umbrellas.

=== Jungle Odyssey ===
Opened in June 2017, Jungle Odyssey is an expansion directly behind The Islands. The area displays rainforest animal species from rainforests around the world like Africa, Asia, and South America, featuring a mixed species exhibit housing capybaras and giant anteaters, as well as exhibits for ocelots, fossas and a pygmy hippopotamus.

== Breeding ==
On September 12, 1999, one of the zoo's female African elephants, Moja, successfully gave birth to a female calf, later named Victoria. This was a major feat for the zoo, because Victoria was the first African elephant to be born and survive in North America since 1982. Also, she was the first to be born to a captive-born mother. A second calf, a male named Callee, was born to another female named Savannah almost exactly one year later on September 19, 2000. The father of both of these calves is a bull named Jackson, who is currently the only male African breeding naturally in North America. Both Moja and Savannah became pregnant again in 2006. On July 9, 2008, Savannah gave birth to a female calf named Angelina. Moja gave birth to a female as well on July 25, 2008. This calf has been named Zuri.

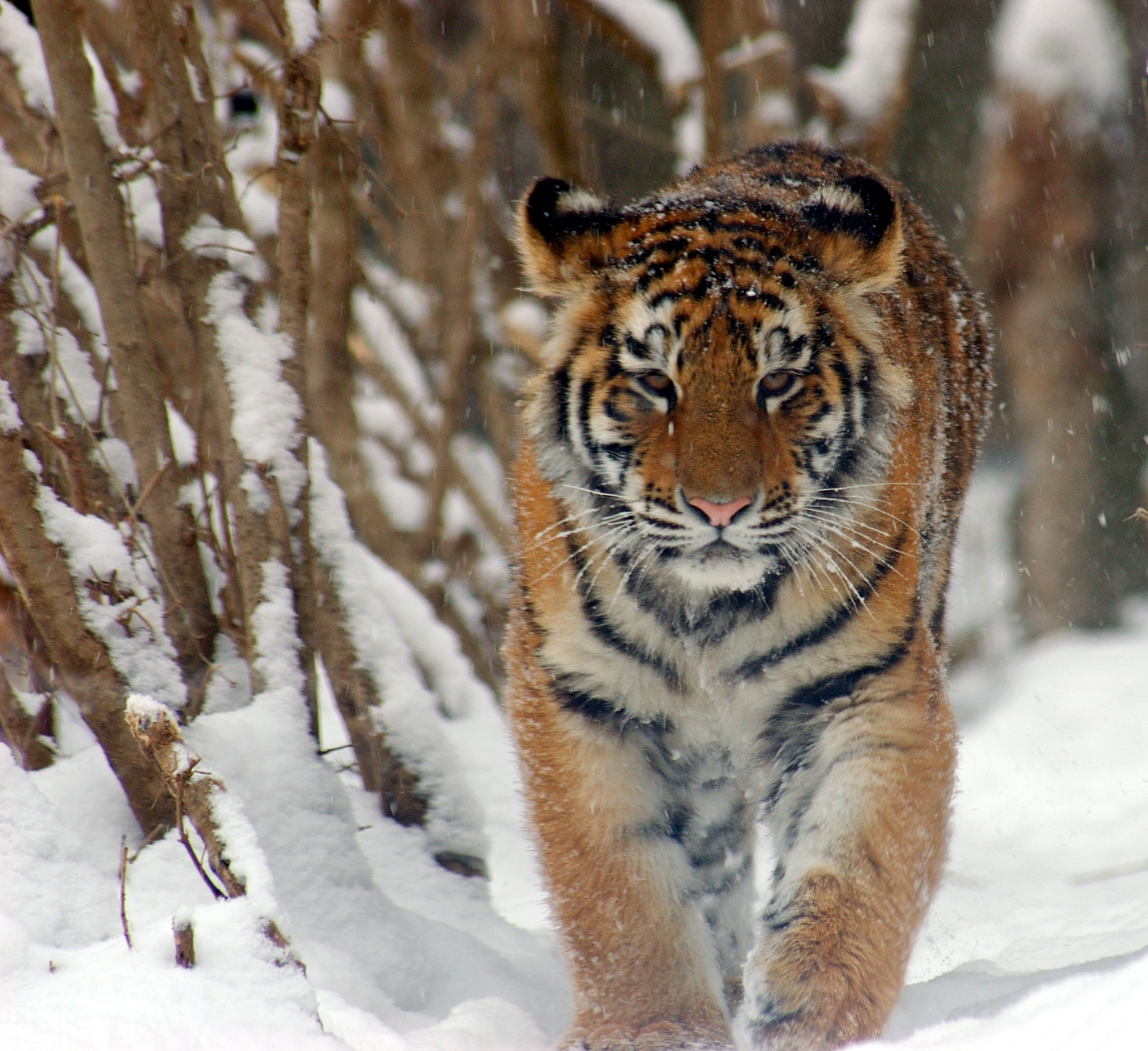
Amur tiger at the zoo

On August 8, 2006, the zoo's female Amur tiger, Toma, gave birth to a litter of three cubs. This is also a major accomplishment because Amurs are endangered, and every successful litter counts a great deal. Although one of the cubs died of a heart defect in September (a female named Nadya), the other two are healthy and doing well. The surviving cubs are a male named Petya and a female named Mara.

Another Amur tiger cub was born to Toma on May 11, 2008. The male cub, Grom (name meaning Thunder for he was born during a thunderstorm), had been taken from his mother because Toma was not being very attentive to him. Handlers later determined that it is most likely because Toma is not producing enough milk, if any at all. On September 12, 2008, the baby cub was named after Billy Ray Cyrus, the country music and television star. Zoo representatives said the donors who paid to name the cub "Billy Ray" wanted to honor a late family member who was a big Cyrus fan. Billy Ray will likely grow up to be about 11 feet long and weigh 450 pounds, according to the zoo.

On October 25, 2009, one of the zoo's African painted dogs, Vega, gave birth to a litter of nine live puppies, and one dead puppy. Vega died the next day, leaving her puppies orphaned. To help nurse and raise the dogs, the zoo found a domesticated dog, Honey, from a local shelter who had recently given birth and was still lactating. Honey immediately took to the puppies and fed them. At the same time, the zoo's vet staff hand-fed the puppies a liquid diet fortified with enzymes. Although, four of the remaining puppies died – the typical mortality rate for African painted dogs is 50 percent – the remaining five were healthy and doing well after a month. The painted dogs were involved in the death of a young boy in November 2012, during which one dog was shot, and the exhibit was closed due to safety concerns. The painted dogs left the zoo in 2013 and are moved to other zoos.
