= San Francisco Zoo tiger attacks =

2006 and 2007 attacks on humans

Tatiana
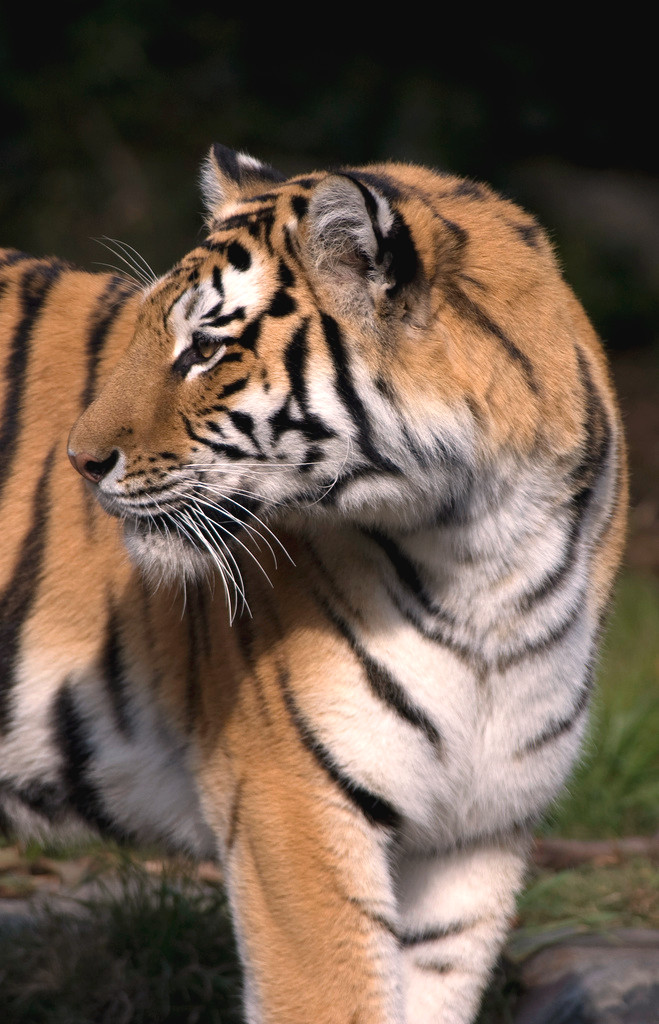
- Tatiana at the San Francisco Zoo, October 2007
- Species: Siberian tiger
- Sex: Female
- Born: Denver Zoo
- Died: December 25, 2007; San Francisco Zoo
- Cause of death: Gunshot wound

Two tiger attacks occurred at the San Francisco Zoo, in 2006 and 2007, both involving a female Siberian tiger named Tatiana who died on December 25, 2007. In the first incident, a zookeeper was bitten on the arm during a public feeding. In the second incident, one person was killed and two others were injured before police shot and killed Tatiana on the scene.

== Background ==
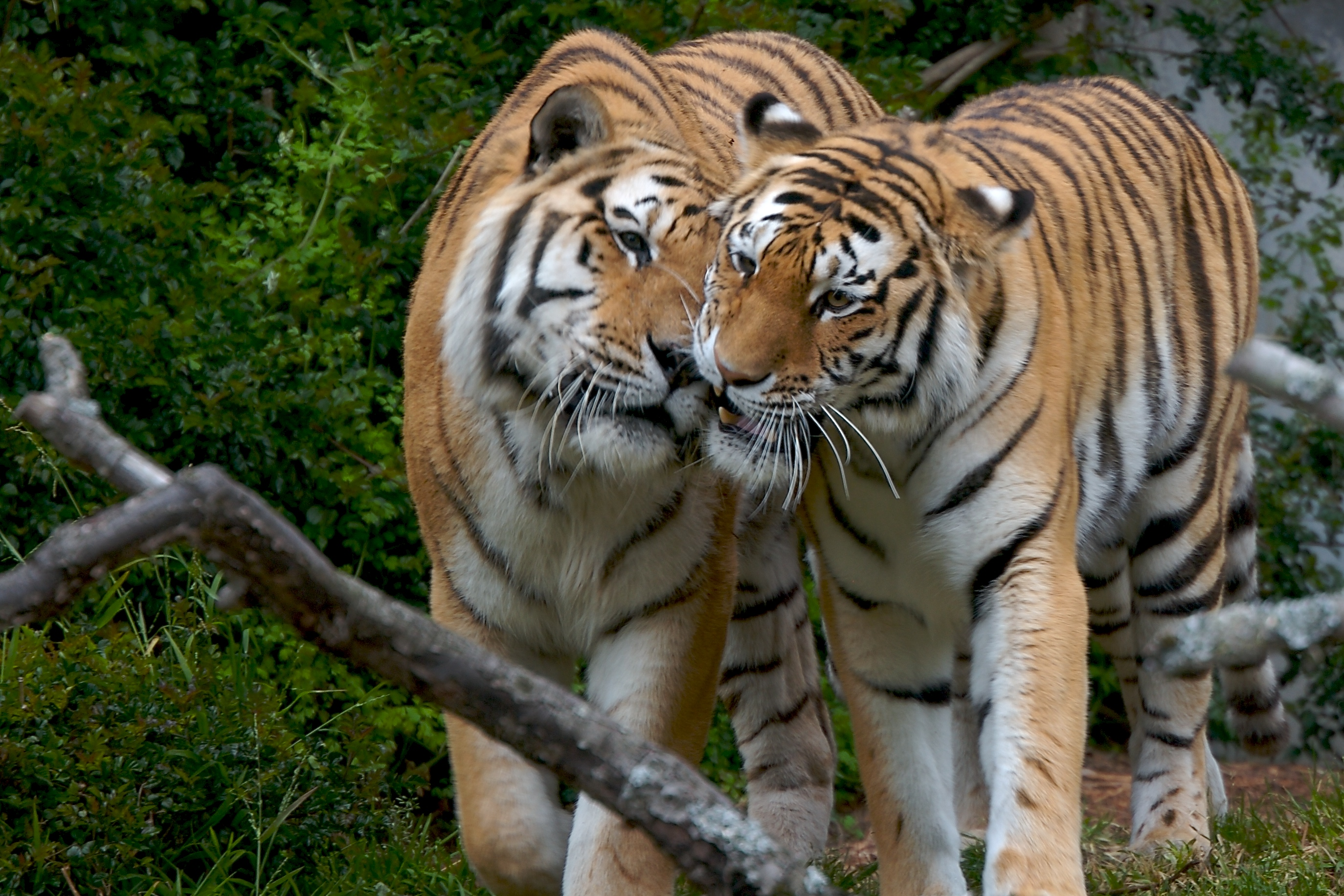
Tatiana with Tony, her mate

Tatiana was born at the Denver Zoo, and was brought to the San Francisco Zoo on December 16, 2005, to provide the 14-year-old Siberian tiger, Tony, with a mate. Tatiana had no prior record of aggression towards humans.

== First attack ==
On December 22, 2006, as veteran zookeeper Lori Komejan was feeding Tatiana through the enclosure's grill, Tatiana clawed and pulled Komejan's right arm through the grill and bit it.

The injury resulted in several surgeries and skin grafts, leaving Komejan's arm severely scarred and permanently impaired.

The California Occupational Safety and Health Administration determined that the zoo had inadequate safety precautions and staff training and fined it $18,000. Komejan sued the zoo, settling in 2008 on undisclosed terms.

The tiger cage was remodeled and re-opened in September 2007.

== Second attack ==
Shortly after closing time on December 25, 2007, Tatiana escaped from her open-air enclosure, killing 17-year-old Carlos Eduardo Sousa Jr. and injuring brothers Amritpal "Paul" Dhaliwal and Kulbir Dhaliwal (19 and 23 years old, respectively). The three individuals had been witnessed throwing objects at and taunting the animal. Afterwards, the two brothers fled to the zoo cafe 300 yards (270 m) away, which was locked. An employee heard their screams and called 9-1-1 at 5:07 pm.

The emergency response was delayed, first because cafe employees said in their call that they suspected that the screaming person was mentally ill and that there was no actual animal attack, and later because zoo security guards were enforcing a lockdown to prevent Tatiana from escaping the zoo grounds.

Armed officers found Tatiana with Kulbir Dhaliwal, but held fire at first for fear of hitting Dhaliwal. They created a distraction which caused the tiger to turn towards the officers, who shot her through the forehead. The Dhaliwal brothers received deep bites and claw wounds on their heads, necks, arms, and hands. They left the hospital on December 29. Sousa was found dead near the tiger grotto with blunt-force injuries to his head and neck, many punctures and scratches to his head, neck and chest, skull and spinal fractures, and a cut to his jugular vein.

The Association of Zoos and Aquariums said the attack was the first time a visitor had been killed by an escaped animal at a member zoo since the Association's founding in 1924. The zoo was closed until January 3, 2008.

=== Investigation ===
It was not immediately apparent how Tatiana had escaped, but police said that Tatiana may have "leaped" or "climbed" the walls of her enclosure. Police undertook an investigation to determine whether one of the victims climbed over a waist-high fence and then dangled a leg or other body part over the edge of a moat around the tiger enclosure.

Two days after the attack, on December 27, 2007, the zoo reported that while the moat, at 33 feet wide, was sufficient by national standards, its initial claim that the grotto's moat wall was 20 feet (6.1 m) tall was incorrect; officials measured it at 12.5 feet (3.8 m) tall, substantially lower than what they had thought initially and what was recorded in zoo records. It was also substantially lower than the Association of Zoos and Aquariums' recommended minimum, 16 feet 4 inches (4.98 m), for such enclosures. Tatiana's rear paws were embedded with concrete chips, suggesting that she had pushed against the moat wall during her escape.

In the days immediately following the attack, the director of the zoo stated that Tatiana was probably provoked. He said, "Somebody created a situation that really agitated her and gave her some sort of a method to break out. There is no possible way the cat could have made it out of there in a single leap. I would surmise that there was help. A couple of feet dangling over the edge could possibly have done it." Sources told the San Francisco Chronicle that pine cones and sticks that might have been thrown at Tatiana had been found and which could not have landed in the vicinity naturally. Paul Dhaliwal later said that the three had yelled and waved at the tiger. According to early news sources, the Dhaliwal brothers had slingshots on them at the time of the attack. In later reports, the police denied that slingshots were found in the victims' car or at the zoo. Zoo visitor Jennifer Miller and her family allegedly saw the group, including an unidentified fourth person, taunting lions less than an hour before the tiger attack. She later identified Carlos Sousa as being part of the group but said Sousa did not join in the taunting. An attorney representing the Dhaliwal brothers stated that they had not taunted the tiger.

In early January 2008, the lead investigator for the city said that the group may have harassed Tatiana, but no charges were filed against them for such behavior. Taunting a zoo animal is a misdemeanor in San Francisco.

Toxicology reports disclosed in mid-January indicated a blood alcohol level of 0.16 for 19-year-old Amritpal Dhaliwal, twice the legal limit for operating a motor vehicle, and that alcohol was also present but under the legal driving limits for Kulbir Dhaliwal, 23, and for Carlos Sousa, 17 (legal drinking age in California is 21). There was also evidence of cannabis use amongst all three. Reporters also noted that "[p]olice found a small amount of marijuana in Kulbir Dhaliwal's 2002 BMW, which the victims drove to the zoo, as well as a partially filled bottle of vodka, according to court documents."

The San Francisco Chronicle described the attitude of the Dhaliwals as "hostile" to the police following the attack, reporting that they initially refused to identify themselves or Carlos Sousa to the police, refused to give interviews to the police until two days after the attack, and would not speak publicly about the details of what happened to them.

=== Changes ===
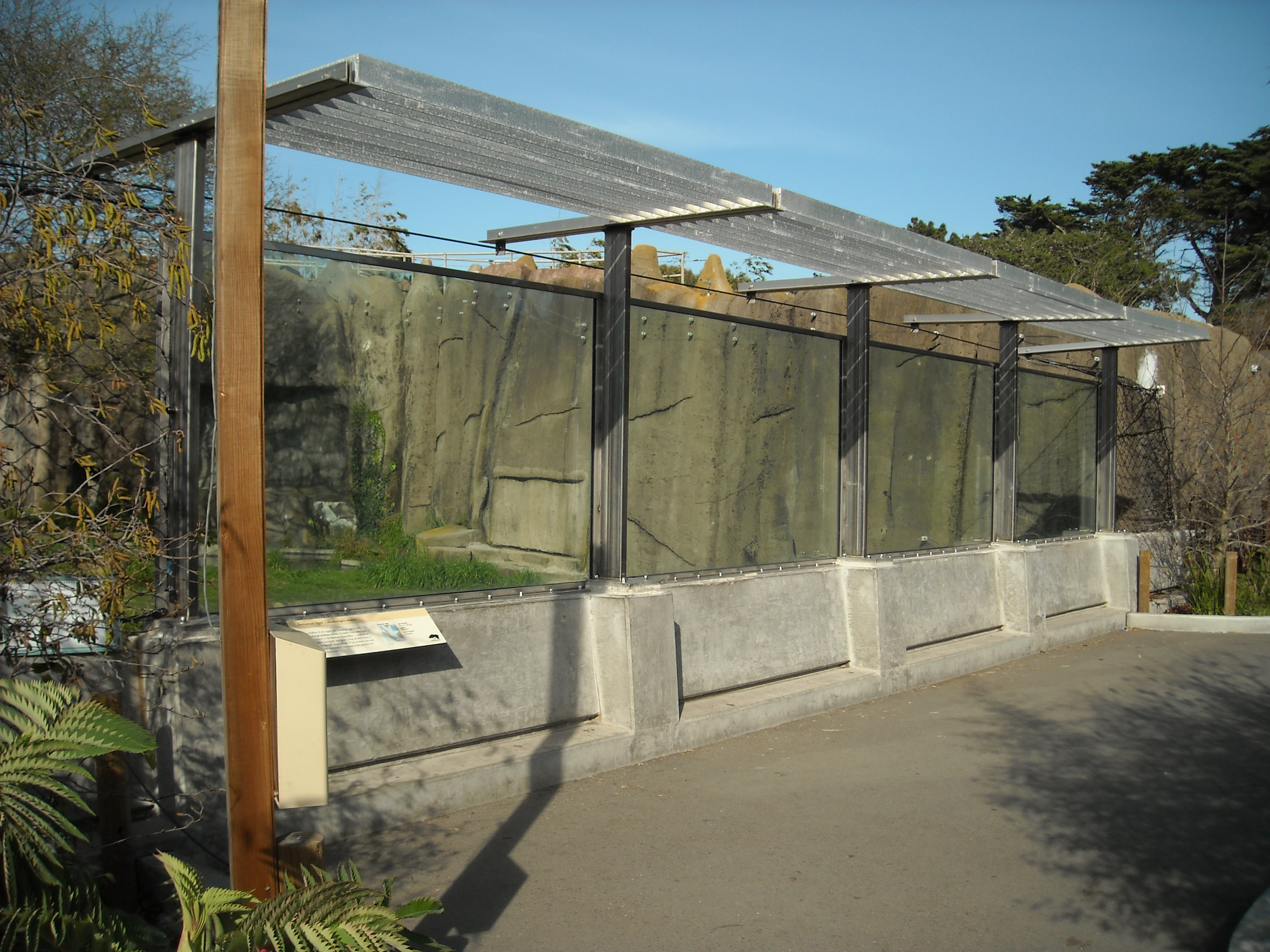
The updated tiger enclosures

On February 16, 2008, the zoo re-opened the exterior tiger exhibit which was extensively renovated to meet the extension of the concrete moat wall up to the minimum height of 16 feet 4 inches from the bottom of the moat, installation of glass fencing on the top of the wall to extend the height to 19 feet, and installation of electrified "hotwire".

The zoo also installed portable loudspeakers that remind visitors to leave promptly at the 5 p.m. closing time and "Protect the Animals" signs that read:

Help make the zoo a safe environment. The magnificent animals in the zoo are wild and possess all their natural instincts. You are a guest in their home. Please remember they are sensitive and have feelings. PLEASE don't tap on glass, throw anything into exhibits, make excessive noise, tease or call out to them.

== Subsequent events ==
On December 25, 2008, a life-size concrete-and-tile sculpture of Tatiana, by Jon Engdahl, was unveiled at the community garden on the Greenwich Steps at 274 Greenwich St. of San Francisco.

Four police officers – Scott Biggs, Yukio Oshita, Kevin O'Leary and Daniel Kroos – were honored for bravery during the incident.

In 2009, a suit by the Dhaliwal brothers against the zoo was settled for $900,000. A separate suit filed by Sousa's parents was settled on undisclosed terms.

Both Dhaliwal brothers had subsequent run-ins with the law. Amritpal Dhaliwal died in 2012 at age 24.
