= Al-Muhajiroun (organization) =

Militant network founded in Saudi Arabia, based in United Kingdom

- Al-Muhajiroun uses the black Flag of Jihad with the shahada in white.
- Abbreviation: AM
- Predecessor: Hizb ut-Tahrir
- Successor: Al Ghurabaa (2004–2006); The Saved Sect (2005–2006); Islam4UK (2008–2010); Muslims Against Crusades (2010–2011)
- Formation: 3 April 1983; 43 years ago
- Founder: Omar Bakri Muhammad
- Type: Islamist, Salafi-jihadist
- Purpose: Islamism; Salafi jihadism Anti-Western sentiment
- Location(s): Saudi Arabia (1983–1986; banned and expelled); United Kingdom (1986–2005 banned)
- Leader: Anjem Choudary
- Key people: Abu Haleema; Abu Izzadeen; Abu Rumaysah; Abu Uzair; Abdul Rahman Saleem; Sulayman Keeler; Sajeel Shahid; Mohammed Junaid Babar; Zacarias Moussaoui; Omar Khyam; Umran Javed; Anthony Small; Khalid Kelly; Michael Adebolajo; Michael Adebowale; Khuram Butt; Usman Khan

Al-Muhajiroun (Arabic: المهاجرون, "The Emigrants") is a proscribed terrorist network based in the United Kingdom. The group was founded by Omar Bakri Muhammad, a Syrian who previously belonged to Hizb ut-Tahrir; he has been denied permission to enter Britain since 2005. The organisation has been linked to international terrorism, homophobia, and antisemitism. In its September 2002 conference "The Magnificent 19", it praised the September 11, 2001 attacks. The network mutates periodically so as to evade the law; it operates under many different aliases.

The group in its original incarnation operated openly in the United Kingdom from 14 January 1986 until the British Government announced an intention ban in August 2005. The group preemptively "disbanded" itself in 2005 to avoid this; two aliases used by the group were proscribed by the British Home Secretary under the Terrorism Act 2006: Al Ghurabaa and The Saviour Sect. Further proscriptions followed with the Terrorism Act 2000 where Islam4UK was proscribed as an Al-Muhajiroun alias and Muslims Against Crusades followed in 2011. More recent aliases have included Need4Khilafah and the Shariah Project, proscribed in 2014, just before prominent members, including Anjem Choudary, were sent to prison.

The organisation and its activities have been condemned by larger British Muslim groups such as the Muslim Council of Britain. In the United Kingdom, Al-Muhajiroun is the most notorious of the domestic Salafi-jihadist groups and its public spokesman Anjem Choudary has significant name recognition; it is considered more radical than its initial parent organisation the Hizb ut-Tahrir, whose British-based branch does not advocate violence against the United Kingdom and were not proscribed until January 2024.

Individual members of Al-Muhajiroun have been implicated in a number of terrorist attacks, including the murder of Lee Rigby (Michael Adebolajo and Michael Adebowale), the 2017 London Bridge attack (Khuram Butt), and the 2019 London Bridge stabbing (Usman Khan). Some members, such as Zacarias Moussaoui, have been implicated in controversies surrounding Al-Qaeda.

It has also operated a Lahore safe house for visiting radicals. Another member, Siddhartha Dhar, became an executioner for the Islamic State of Iraq and the Levant (ISIL).

== Names ==
Since they were forced to disband in 2004–2005, Al-Muhajiroun network has adopted a variety of different names to try and work around British law; each time their aliases have been subsequently proscribed under the various Terrorism Acts. Typically, the sitting Home Secretary at the time names the specific organisation as proscribed; for example in 2010, Labour Home Secretary Alan Johnson named Islam4UK in relation to the Wootton Bassett affair. The organisation has used the following names; Al Ghurabaa (2004–2006), The Saved Sect (2005–2006), Ahlus Sunnah wal Jamaah (2005–2009), Islam4UK (2009–2010), Muslims Against Crusades (2010–2011) and since then Need4Khilafah, the Shariah Project and the Islamic Dawah Association.

== History ==
=== Origins in Hizb ut-Tahrir: 1983–1996 ===
The network originated in the Middle East, inspired by the life and works of Omar Bakri Muhammad. Born in Aleppo, Syria, to a wealthy Sunni family, during his youth the state was taken over by the Arab Socialist Ba'ath Party – Syria Region; it was an organisation which promoted Arab socialism and Arab nationalism, rather than having an Islamic ideology. Although the Ba'ath Party was nominally secular, and Syria was a majority-Sunni country, many of the ruling Ba'athists were drawn from the Shia Alawite minority; these included Hafez al-Assad, who became President of Syria in 1971. Some of the religiously inclined Syrian Sunnis, including Omar Bakri, joined the Muslim Brotherhood of Syria; although Bakri was a member during the uprising which led to the 1982 Hama massacre, Bakri himself played no part.

Omar Bakri lived for some time in Beirut, Lebanon. He joined a number of other Islamist organisations while he studied. In Beirut, this included the Hizb ut-Tahrir (where its founder Taqiuddin al-Nabhani had died in 1977). Omar Bakri then lived in Cairo, Egypt. He moved to Mecca, Saudi Arabia, to study at Umm al-Qura University and the Islamic University of Madinah. In the Saudi Kingdom, Hizb ut-Tahrir was a banned organisation. According to Omar Bakri's account of events, by 1983, he had gathered some 38 followers who endorsed creating a Saudi Arabia-based branch of the organisation—but the nearest branch, based in Kuwait, would not allow him to create a branch in Saudi Arabia, and suspended his membership. Subsequently, on 3 March 1983 at Jeddah, he created the group Al-Muhajiroun. That date was "the 59th anniversary of the destruction of the Ottoman Caliphate." Sadek Hamid, a scholar of Islamic politics, has claimed that this new organisation was just a front for Hizb ut-Tahrir. While Omar Bakri lived in Saudi Arabia he worked for Eastern Electric (owned by Shamsan and Abdul-Aziz as-Suhaybi), first in Riyadh, and then at its Jeddah branch. In January 1986, Al-Mahajiroun was banned in Saudi Arabia and Omar Bakhri was arrested in Jeddah, but he was released on bail and he fled to the United Kingdom. After spending some time in the United States to study, he returned to Britain where he became head of Hizb ut-Tahrir Britain.

=== Al-Muhajiroun in Britain: 1996–2004 ===
Bakri's involvement in Hizb ut-Tahrir ended on 16 January 1996 when he was dismissed by the group's global leadership; following this he reinstated Al-Muhajiroun in early 1996. In the eyes of the Middle Eastern leadership of Hizb ut-Tahrir, Omar Bakri had become a liability to their organisation due to various extravagant statements he had made; justifying the assassination of Prime Minister John Major, stating that Queen Elizabeth II would convert to Islam and telling Bosniaks to reject American food aid during the Yugoslav Wars and to "eat Serbs" instead. Omar Bakri Muhammad and his group was the subject of a Channel 4 documentary entitled the Tottenham Ayatollah in 1997, in which Jon Ronson, an investigative journalist of Jewish-background followed Omar Bakri and Al-Muhajiroun around for a year. A young Anjem Choudary also featured as the group's Deputy. The documentary mentions mainstream Muslim groups (who felt that their activities were leading to a demonisation of all Muslims), Conservative MP Rupert Allason, the Board of Deputies of British Jews and even Hosni Mubarak, President of Egypt criticising the group. The sitting Foreign Secretary in the Conservative Party government; Malcolm Rifkind; responded to international concerns by saying as Al-Muhajiroun had not broken any specific laws they could not be prosecuted. Omar Bakri openly discussed living on Jobseeker's Allowance and the group publicly protested in favour of the Sharia, against homosexuality and other aspects in contemporary British society that it considered to be immoral. The group claimed that they were collecting donations for groups in conflict with the State of Israel, such as Hamas, Hezbollah and Egyptian Islamic Jihad, but none of these groups have ever confirmed connections or if any money came to them. Yotam Feldner of the Middle East Media Research Institute, a pro-Israeli group, cites reports from Egyptian newspaper Al-Ahram Weekly in November 1998, whereby Omar Bakri is alleged to have presented himself as a spokesman for Osama bin Laden's "International Islamic Front for Jihad Against Jews and Crusaders."

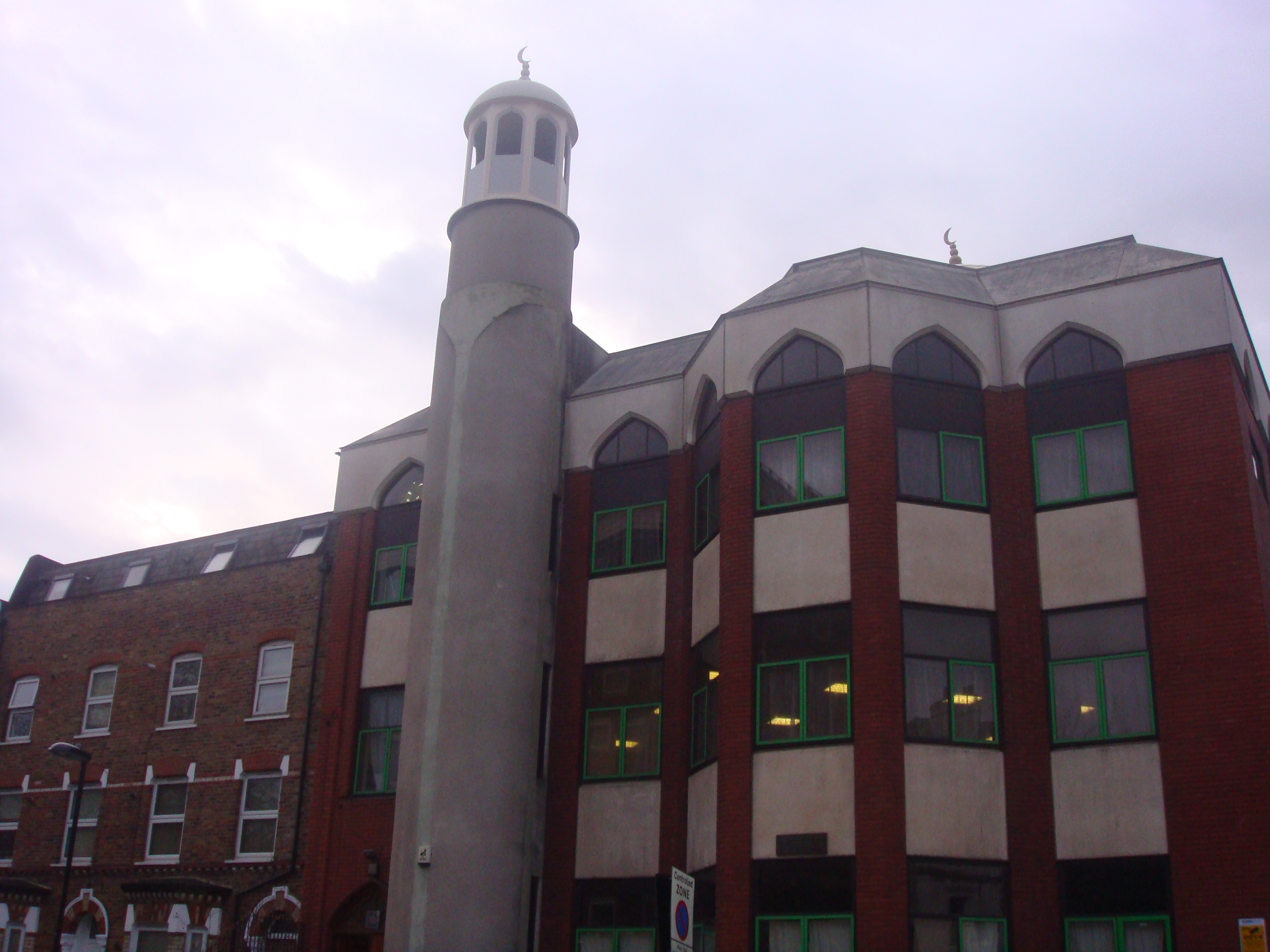
Finsbury Park Mosque in Islington, under Abu Hamza from 1997 until 2003, was an important centre for Al-Muhajiroun. The Mosque has since been reopened under unaffiliated authorities.

During the 1990s, a number of radical Islamists who were wanted by the authorities in a number of Middle Eastern countries sought refuge in the United Kingdom, particularly London, leading some such as the French intelligence services to ridicule the situation as "Londonistan". Particularly close to Al-Muhajiroun was the Egyptian Abu Hamza al-Masri, who was the imam of Finsbury Park Mosque from 1997 until 2003 (since that time the mosque has been reopened under new authorities who are not affiliated to these tendencies). Abu Hamza had previously been an adviser to the Algerian Armed Islamic Group and had his own group called "Supporters of Shariah" which held joint protests with Al-Muhajiroun. Abu Qatada; who was associated with the Jordanian group Jaysh Mohammad and would later write sympathetically about the activities of Osama bin Laden; spoke at a Al-Muhajiroun meeting in November 1999 to raise funds for mujahideen fighters in Chechnya (as part of the Second Chechen War). Contacts were also maintained between Omar Bakri's group and other London exiles who spoke at Al-Muhajiroun gatherings; Yassir al-Sirri of Vanguards of Conquest and Mohammad al-Massari of Hizb ut-Tahrir. In the first two years of its new existence, the group did not advocate violence against the United Kingdom; Omar Bakri claimed in London-newspaper Asharq Al-Awsat, this was because he had a "covenant of peace" with the British government when they granted him asylum (though while still part of Hizb ut-Tahrir, Omar Bakri had earlier made comments in 1991 about a potential assassination of Prime Minister John Major, during the Gulf War). In the early days of New Labour, Home Secretary Jack Straw even appointed Al-Muhajiroun activist Makbool Javaid (brother-in-law of future Mayor of London, Sadiq Khan) to a newly formed Race Relations Forum.

This situation changed in September 1998, as seven members of Egyptian Islamic Jihad, including Hani al-Sibai, Sayyed Ajami and Sayyed Ahmed Abdel-Maqssuod, were arrested by the Metropolitan Police's Special Branch as part of Operation Challenge for alleged violations of the Prevention of Terrorism (Temporary Provisions) Act 1989. This was in the aftermath of the 1998 United States embassy bombings in Kenya and Tanzania, a joint operation by Egyptian Islamic Jihad and Al-Qaeda (the two would merge in 2001), killing 224 people. The "Londonistan" situation, as it was known, had long being criticised by some of the leading Arab world governments such as Egypt, Saudi Arabia, Algeria and others, who regarded the groups as a threat to their national security also. After the arrests, Omar Bakri described Britain in Al-Ahram Weekly as "the spearhead of blasphemy that seeks to overthrow Muslims and the Islamic caliphate" and claimed that the seven men had been "lulled and betrayed into believing they could seek sanctuary in Britain from their corrupt regimes", claiming that Britain was motivated by a desire for "future economic favours" from the likes of Saudi Arabia. Six months after the arrests, Al-Muhajiroun and others staged a demonstration in front of 10 Downing Street to protest the continued incarceration of the seven men and they, including al-Sibai were eventually released. Tony Blair, who was the Labour Party's Prime Minister at the time of the arrests, two decades later in 2017 accused al-Sibai of having radicalised members of the so-called "Beatles" group of ISIS militants, including "Jihadi John" (Mohammed Emwazi) and El Shafee Elsheikh.

Now that the Americans, the British, and, it is safe to assume, also the French, have begun to bomb Muslims in Afghanistan, government buildings here, military installations, and No. 10 Downing Street have become legitimate targets. This also means Prime Minister Tony Blair has become a legitimate target. If any Muslim wants to kill him or get rid of him, I would not shed a tear for him. In the Islamic view, such a man would not be punished for his deeds, but would be praised.

— Abdul Rahman Saleem, Al-Muhajiroun spokesman, 10 October 2001.

In 1998, the so-called "Aden Ten" (including eight British citizens) were arrested, while plotting attacks in Yemen. Omar Bakri boasted of connections, but the men were more directly inspired by Abu Hamza and his idea of Yemen as a starting point for an "Islamic Revolution". Two years later in 2000, the first British-born suicide bomber Mohammed Bilal Ahmed of Birmingham, blew himself up at an Indian Army barracks in Jammu and Kashmir, killing nine people. Omar Bakri described Ahmed as a student of his. Domestically, on university campuses, Britain's National Union of Students banned Al-Muhajiroun in March 2001 after complaints were made about literature promoted by the group (particularly pertaining to Jews) and the advertisement of militant camps; Manchester University and the University of Birmingham were flashpoints for this. On an international level, closer attention was placed on Islamist groups following the September 11, 2001 attacks carried out by Al-Qaeda against the United States and the subsequent invasion of Afghanistan which followed to overthrow the Taliban-government which was hosting Al-Qaeda (the United Kingdom under Blair's leadership joined as part of the ISAF). In the immediate aftermath of the start of the War in Afghanistan, Al-Muhajiroun spokesman Abdul Rahman Saleem (born Rahman Yahyaei) made statements proclaiming that terrorist attacks against government targets in Britain and even killing the Prime Minister would be legitimate acts.

In the aftermath of the 9/11 attacks, Al-Muhajiroun mostly focused on what they claimed was the injustice of the subsequent invasion of the Islamic Emirate of Afghanistan and often held meetings where the flag of the Taliban; a white flag with the shahada in black; was displayed. According to a report Hope not Hate, a self-described anti-fascist group closely linked to the British Labour Party, Omar Bakri bragged of connections between Al-Muhajiroun and the so-called "Tipton Three" (Ruhal Ahmed, Asif Iqbal and Shafiq Rasul), who were arrested in Afghanistan fighting for the Taliban and held by the United States at Guantanamo Bay detention camp. Richard Reid the so-called "Shoe Bomber" during the failed 2001 shoe bomb attempt was radicalised at the AM-linked Finsbury Park Mosque. Aftab Manzoor, Afzal Munir and Mohamed Omar who died in Afghanistan fighting for the Taliban and the Pakistan-based Harkat-ul-Mujahideen had AM-connections. Indeed, Al-Muhajiroun maintained a safehouse in Lahore for visiting radicals fighting for the Taliban. The most explicit connection between AM and the 9/11 attacks itself was Zacarias Moussaoui who was radicalised by the group in Brixton during the 1990s; Moussaoui pled guilty to conspiring to carry out the attacks, but was in prison in Minnesota at the time that they were carried out (he was subsequently incarcerated at ADX Florence). On 11 September 2002, Abu Hamza along with Al-Muhajiroun held a conference which came to be known as the "Magnificent 19" meeting (a term referring to the hijackers). Promoted as the launching of the "Islamic Council of Britain" (a name chosen deliberately to cause public confusion with the mainstream Muslim Council of Britain), supposedly to advocate for sharia law, the conference at Finsbury Park Mosque was entitled "September the 11th 2001: A Towering Day in History" and posters, showing an image of planes crashing into the World Trade Center were put up in Stepney, Blackburn and Birmingham. Omar Bakri said that attendees "look at September 11 like a battle, as a great achievement by the mujahideen against the evil superpower. I never praised September 11 after it happened but now I can see why they did it" and described Osama bin Laden and Al-Qaeda as "sincere [and] devoted people who stood firm against the invasion of a Muslim country." Anjem Choudary, Omar Bakri's deputy and a spokesman for Al-Muhajiroun also attended.

=== "Disbandment", early aliases: 2004–2009 ===
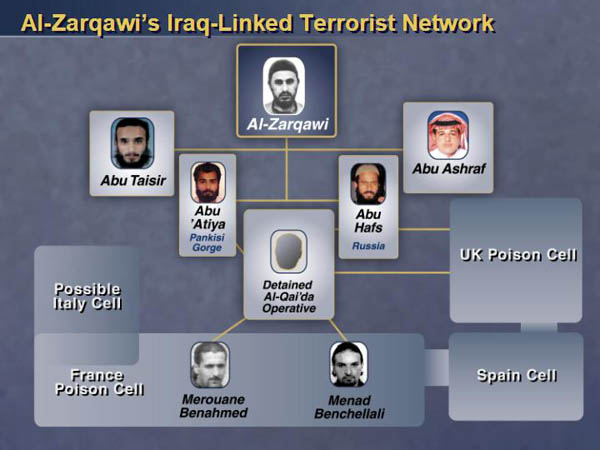
The "UK Poison Cell", which Al-Muhajiroun associate Bourgass was convicted for, was mentioned by Colin Powell in his presentation to the United Nations, endorsing the Iraq War.

In early 2002, the Metropolitan Police made a number of arrests in regards to the Wood Green ricin plot, an alleged Islamist bioterrorism plot using the poison ricin (derived from seeds of the castor oil plant) by immigrants of Algerian-origin against the London Underground. Later the same month, during a raid on a flat in Crumpsall, north Manchester, DC Stephen Oake was murdered with a kitchen knife by Kamel Bourgass, an illegal immigrant from Algeria. Bourgass also stabbed three other members of Greater Manchester Police. He was wanted in connection to the Wood Green ricin plot, but was not immediately recognised. Bourgass had attended meetings of Al-Muhajiroun leading up to the incident and in the aftermath, six days later Finsbury Park Mosque was raided. The nature of the plot itself was controversial, no purified ricin was found, though notes and castor oil seeds were and most of the people arrested were eventually released. The only person ultimately convicted in court in 2005 in relation to the ricin plot was Bourgass, this was largely due to having notes in his possession on how to make ricin, cyanide and botulinum. Nevertheless, Colin Powell in his February 2003 presentation to the United Nations, arguing for commissioning the Iraq War based on alleged connections between Saddam Hussein and al-Qaeda, made reference to a "UK Poison Cell" as part of an international network.

Two brothers from Manchester, Adeel Shahid and Sajeel Shahid opened a branch of Al-Muhajiroun in Pakistan and ran a "safehouse" in Lahore for Islamists from the West (including the United Kingdom) to back the Taliban and Al-Qaeda against ISAF forces in neighbouring Afghanistan. One of the more notable individuals whom Omar Bakri and Sajeel Shahid enabled to travel to Pakistan was Mohammed Junaid Babar, who intended to go to Peshawar, but ended up in Lahore. While in Pakistan, Mohammed Junaid Babar came into contact with Mohammad Sidique Khan who would later plan the 7 July 2005 London bombings. These activities of the organisation in Pakistan were controversial to the government there, due to Islamists hostility to sitting President of Pakistan, Pervez Musharraf. A speaker at one of the same meetings as Sajeel Shahid was former Major-General Zahirul Islam Abbasi, who had previously been involved in a coup against the government of Pakistan. Back in Britain, things came to a head for Al-Muhajiroun in March 2004, with the launching of Operation Crevice by the Metropolitan Police. A number of the men arrested and later convicted (Omar Khyam, Salahuddin Amin, Jawad Akbar, Anthony Garcia and Waheed Mahmood) had associations with Al-Muhajiroun; 1300 pounds of ammonium nitrate fertiliser was also recovered and the men, mostly of Pakistani-origin, were accused of planning bombing attacks on shopping centres, night clubs and gas works in Britain. Mohammed Junaid Babar testified as a witness against his former associates.

Al Muhajiroun disbanded on 13 October 2004 to avoid proscription. However, it was believed that The Saviour Sect was to all intents and purposes Al Muhajiroun operating under a new name. Shortly after the 7 July 2005 London bombings Tony Blair announced the group would be banned as part of a series of measures against condoning or glorifying terrorism. Just days after the 7 July 2005 London bombings the Oxford-based Malaysian jurist, Shaykh Muhammad Afifi al-Akiti, issued his landmark fatwa against suicide bombing and targeting innocent civilians, titled Defending the Transgressed, by Censuring the Reckless against the Killing of Civilians, which was written in response to this controversial "Magnificent 19" statement made by Al-Muhajiroun.

Home Secretary Charles Clarke banned Omar Bakri Muhammad from the United Kingdom on 12 August 2005 on the grounds that his presence was "not conducive to the public good." Two other offshoot organisations, The Saviour Sect and Al Ghurabaa had previously been banned for the 'glorification' of terrorism under the Terrorism Act 2006.

The organisation was then re-founded as the Ahlus Sunnah Wal Jammah on 18 November 2005, in north London by Sulayman Keeler. He called Queen Elizabeth II an enemy of Islam and Muslims. In February 2006, ASWJ helped organize the Islamist demonstration outside Danish Embassy in London in 2006.

In December 2006, ASWJ issued a call on one of its websites for Muslims to fight the Ethiopian attack against the Islamic Courts Union in Somalia "financially, physically and verbally". On 10 March 2009, ASWJ demonstrated in the town to protest against the Royal Anglian Regiment's homecoming parade following the latter's posting in Afghanistan. The demonstration was a deliberately provocative publicity stunt, and had been disowned by representatives from Luton's Islamic communities. The protest, although small, attracted media attention, generating anger that the authorities had given the demonstration permission and police protection.

=== Islam4UK and Wootton Bassett: 2009–2010 ===
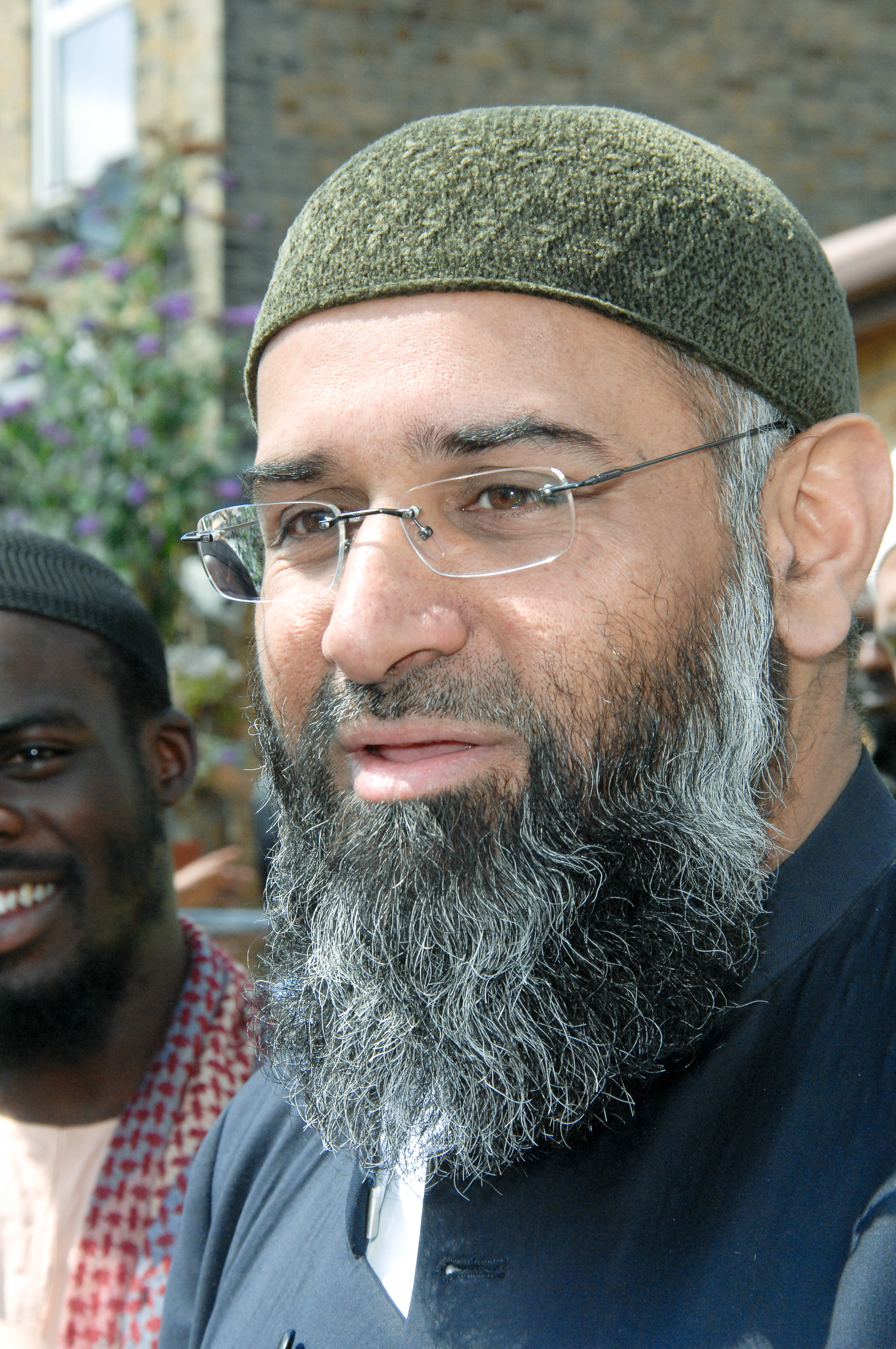
Anjem Choudary.

The group was then relaunched in 2009 under the alias "Islam4UK", described itself as having "been established by sincere Muslims as a platform to propagate the supreme Islamic ideology within the United Kingdom as a divine alternative to man-made law" to "convince the British public about the superiority of Islam, thereby changing public opinion in favour of Islam in order to transfer the authority and power to the Muslims in order to implement the Sharia (in Britain)". It was led by Anjem Choudary.

A demonstration it made against returning British soldiers in Luton gained media attention and led to the formation of the English Defence League (EDL). On 16 October 2009, members of the organisation protested against the visit to Britain by Dutch MP Geert Wilders. They carried banners with slogans such as "Shariah is the solution, freedom go to hell" and "Geert Wilders deserves Islamic punishment".

In January 2010 the group gained widespread media attention by announcing plans to hold a protest march through Wootton Bassett; an English town where unofficial public mourning takes place for corteges of armed forces personnel killed on active service, as they make their way from RAF Lyneham to Oxford. Reports that the group planned to carry empty coffins to "represent the thousands of Muslims who have died" were denied by the group, although the empty coffins had been proposed by Choudary himself. Choudary said that the event would be peaceful, and that it was not timed to coincide with any mourning processions. The announcement was condemned by British Prime Minister Gordon Brown, who said that plans for the march were "disgusting" and that "to offend the families of dead or wounded troops would be completely inappropriate". The Home Secretary, Alan Johnson, indicated he would agree to any request from the Wiltshire Police or local government to ban the march under Section 13 of the Public Order Act 1986. Choudary said he chose Wootton Bassett to attract maximum attention and, he asserted, 500 members of Islam4UK would carry 'symbolic coffins' in memory of the Muslim civilians 'murdered by merciless' coalition forces.

The Muslim Council of Britain stated that it "condemns the call by...Islam4UK for their proposed march in Wootton Bassett", and continues, "Like other Britons, Muslims are not opposed to Britain's Armed Forces." The Wiltshire Islamic Cultural Centre stated "We, along with all other Muslim community groups in Wiltshire and the surrounding area, including Bath Islamic Society and Swindon Thamesdown Islamic Association, unreservedly condemn this march," adding, "Therefore we are putting the record straight and letting the media and general public know that the vast majority of Muslims have nothing to do with this group", and asking that Wiltshire Police ban the march. They stated that they, along with Call to Islam Centre and Masjid Al-Ghurabah, would counter-demonstrate against "Islam4UK/Al-Muhajiroon". On 10 January 2010 Islam4UK said it was cancelling its planned march in Wootton Bassett; however, the police had not actually received a request for permission for the march.

Islam4UK was listed as an alias of Al Ghurabaa and The Saved Sect, already proscribed under the Terrorism Act 2004, by an order on 14 January 2010. In announcing the proscription, the then British Home Secretary Alan Johnson said: "It is already proscribed under two other names – Al Ghurabaa and The Saved Sect".

In the January 2010 order and a November 2011 order, the names Al Muhajiroun, Call to Submission, Islamic Path, London School of Sharia and Muslims Against Crusades were also listed as aliases. In June 2014, Need4Khilafah, the Shariah Project and the Islamic Dawah Association were added to the list. Note that the order is not needed to establish an alias as identical to another name of a proscribed organization, it is enough that the two are to all intents and purposes the same, and that the individual prosecuted has performed a proscribed act.

Islam4UK issued a statement saying, "Today's ban is another nail in the coffin of capitalism and another sign of the revival of Islam and Muslims." They restated their goal: "Therefore, we will one day liberate our land from occupation and implement the Shariah not just in Muslim countries but also right here in Great Britain. This is something that we believe in, live by and hope that in our lifetime we will witness". In a further statement, issued on the same day via their website, they stated that "Islam4UK has been contacted by authorities to (force) shut down its operations, we stress this domain name will no longer be used by us, but the struggle for Khilafah (aka "the Caliphate") will continue regardless of what the disbelievers plot against the Muslims. It is the duty of all Muslims to rise up and call for the Khilafah wherever they may be". The ban has led some ("the left", according to Sunny Hundal writing in The Guardian) to criticise it as a "blow to free expression", which will "serve to undermine the government's effort to prevent violent extremism". Deborah Orr has commented in The Guardian that the ban "erodes democratic rights with the intention of defending them".

=== Muslims Against Crusades: 2010–2011 ===
The network re-emerged as Muslims Against Crusades (abbreviated MAC), notionally under Abu Assadullah in 2010, featuring members of Islam4UK after their banning such as boxer Anthony Small and Anjem Choudary. Muslims Against Crusades maintained that Muslims are not "obliged to obey the law of the land in whatever country they reside". In 2011 the group proposed that Muslims should set up independent emirates in select cities in the UK, operating under sharia (Islamic law) entirely outside British law. The group suggested the towns of Bradford, Dewsbury, and Tower Hamlets in the East End of London as the possible first test beds for these entities. The group has often clashed with the English Defence League. Home Secretary Theresa May banned the group from midnight on 11 November 2011, making membership or support of the group a criminal offence. The group was denounced by the Muslim Council of Britain, who described MAC as "a tiny, and utterly deplorable, extremist group". Many former MAC activists are currently active in Islamist groups known as 'Millatu Ibrahim' and the 'Tawheed Movement.'

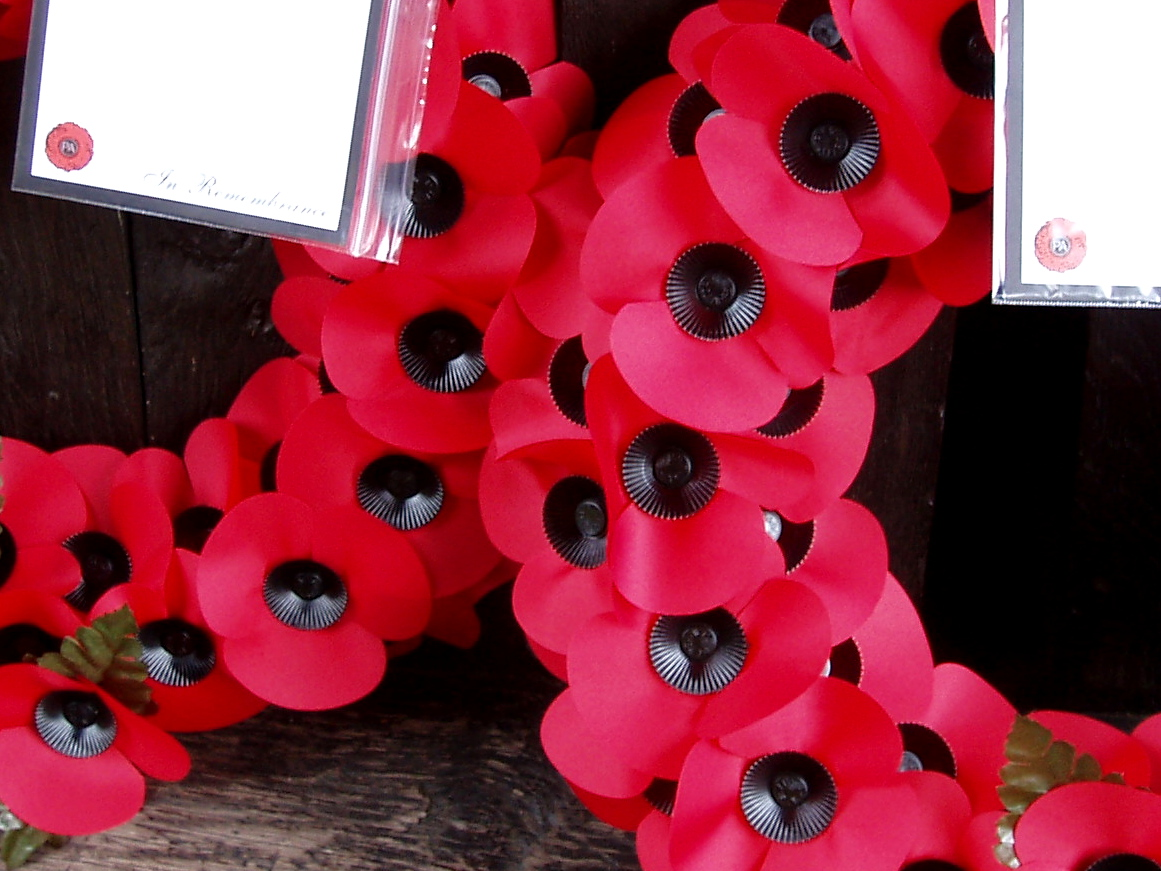
During Remembrance Day 2010, Al-Muhajroun acting under Muslims Against Crusades, courted controversy by burning poppies during the two-minute silence.

MAC engaged in a number of incidents including protests outside the Royal Albert Hall and in Kensington on 11 November 2010, when two large plastic poppies were burned during the Remembrance Day silence. A 2010 Remembrance Day ceremony in London was disrupted by members of the organization, who were protesting against British Army actions in Afghanistan and Iraq. They burnt large poppies and chanted "British soldiers burn in hell" during the two-minute silence. Two of the men were arrested and charged for threatening behavior. One was convicted and fined £50. The same group planned to hold another protest in 2011 named Hell for Heroes, declaring that soldiers fighting in Iraq and Afghanistan deserve to go to hell. The group was banned by the Home Secretary the day before the planned protest. Throughout 2010 and 2011 there were various protests against the imprisonment of Muslims, with calls for their release; and calls for a withdrawal of non-Muslim forces from Muslim countries. There was a protest against pastor Terry Jones when he burnt a Quran (the holy book of Islam) in Florida, US on 20 March 2011.

They applied to the police to stage a demonstration in London to disrupt the royal wedding of Prince William and Catherine Middleton on 29 April 2011, but this was not allowed. They later cancelled their protest due to a "possible danger to life"

On 2 May 2011 Osama bin Laden, who had led the Islamist al-Qaeda organization responsible for violent attacks on the United States on 11 September 2001, was killed in Pakistan by US forces. On 7 May hundreds of UK Muslims and MAC members held a rally and Salat al-Janazah (funeral prayer) for him outside the US embassy in London. When protesters tried to storm the embassy there were clashes with police. Anjem Choudary, who organised the protest, warned of an attack similar to the 7 July 2005 London bombings in response to Bin Laden's death.

On 30 July around 50 members of MAC and Waltham Forest Muslims marched for two hours from Leyton tube station to Walthamstow town square calling for democracy to be replaced by sharia law and chanted slogans such as 'democracy—hypocrisy', 'Sharia for UK' and 'Secularism go to hell'. In August, members of Muslims Against Crusades held a demonstration denouncing the Shia denomination and "anti-Islamic" Shia regimes of Syria and Iran. To mark the tenth anniversary of 11 September attacks, around 100 men linked to the group protested outside the US embassy in London, burning US flags and chanting through megaphones. The protest could be heard by mourners in 11 September Memorial Garden nearby, where a minute's silence was being observed to mark the first aeroplane hitting the World Trade Centre in New York City.

On 10 November 2011 British Home Secretary Theresa May banned the group after it planned to repeat the poppy-burning demonstration; membership of Muslims Against Crusades became illegal at midnight. On 2 December 2011 twenty people were arrested on suspicion of being members of a banned group, and two for obstruction and violent disorder at a demonstration outside the US embassy in London; the police did not confirm a report that the protesters were members of MAC. The group was ridiculed on the television program Have I Got News For You, with Ian Hislop saying "aren't they a couple hundred years late, these Muslims Against Crusades?"

=== Need4Khilafah and recent: 2011–present ===
In June 2014, the UK government banned three more groups it suspected of being aliases for the extremist organisation al-Muhajiroun:

- Need4Khilafah
- the Shariah Project
- the Islamic Dawah Association

== Ideology ==
Al-Muhajiroun's proclaimed aims are to establish public awareness about Islam, to influence public opinion in favour of the sharia, to convince members of society that Islam is inherently political and a viable ideological alternative, to unite Muslims on a global scale in the threats facing the Ummah and to resume the Islamic way of life by re-establishing the Islamic Caliphate. Members have carried out numerous murders and terrorist attacks. Their general worldview; with a heavy focus on a pan-Islamist-orientated worldwide caliphate is derived directly from its parent organisation Hizb al-Tahrir (founded by Taqiuddin al-Nabhani) as espoused by Omar Bakri Muhammad. The organisation is commonly described as Islamist and is sometimes classified as Salafist, however, some Salafists (who follow the line of Rabee al-Madkhali and other Salafists mainstream in the Arab Gulf states), consider Al-Muhajiroun and other modern "jihadist" groups which focus on politically motivated terrorism (particularly indiscriminate attacks against civilians) as modern day Kharajites, whose ideological line derives ultimately from the Muslim Brotherhood and Sayyid Qutb (supposedly influenced by non-Islamic "Leninist" ideas, these individuals, in their view "appropriated" the Salafi name for means of credibility within Islamic circles), rather than Ibn Taymiyyah.

== Terrorism ==
=== Statements ===
Aside from declaring the 9/11 hijackers "the Magnificent 19", controversial statements made by al-Muhajiroun include one warning the British government that it was "sitting on a box of dynamite and have only themselves to blame if after attacking the Islamic movements and the Islamic scholars, it all blows up in their face".

In 2004 BBC Newsnight quoted one Al-Muhajiroun leader, Abu Ibrahim, as saying,

When they speak about 11 September, when the two planes magnificently run through those buildings, OK and people turn around and say, 'hang on a second, that is barbaric. Why did you have to do that?' You know why? Because of ignorance. ... For us it's retaliation. Islam is not the starter of wars. If you start the war we won't turn the other cheek. ... According to you it can't be right. According to Islam it's right. When you talk about innocent civilians, do you not kill innocent civilians in Iraq?

=== Attacks ===
On 29 April 2003, Asif Hanif and Omar Sharif, who attended some of Al-Muhajiroun's circles, carried out the Mike's Place suicide bombing in Tel Aviv, Israel, that killed three people and injured 60 others.

In 2006, another individual connected with Al-Muhajiroun allegedly detonated a bomb in India, killing himself and destroying an army barracks.

In 2007, five young Muslims with Al-Muhajiroun connections – Omar Khyam, Waheed Mahmood, Anthony Garcia, Jawad Akbar and Saladhuddin Amin – were convicted of a multiple bombing plot to use fertiliser bombs "which police say could have killed hundreds of British people. The men were caught after police and MI5 launched a massive surveillance operation." The surveillance culminated in a raid called Operation Crevice. The targets included "the Bluewater shopping centre in Kent, the Ministry of Sound nightclub in London and Britain's domestic gas network." According to Professor Anthony Glees, director of the Brunel Centre for Intelligence and Security Studies:

The fertiliser bomb trial has given us the smoking-gun evidence that groups like al-Muhajiroun have had an important part in radicalising young British Muslims, and that this can create terrorists.

On 22 May 2013, the murder of Lee Rigby was carried out by two members of Al-Muhajiroun, Michael Adebolajo and Michael Adebowale. From about 2003, Adebolajo was corrupted by Bakri and then by Choudary, after Bakri left the country in August 2005. One former associate said Adebolajo that "locked himself in this room with this bloke for a few hours and when he came out he was a Muslim convert. He was spouting all kinds of stuff and said he had changed his name." Adebolajo insisted to be called during the Rigby trial "Mujahid".

At least one of the perpetrators of the 2017 London Bridge attack, Khuram Butt, was a member.

The 2019 London Bridge stabbing, carried out on 29 November by Usman Khan, a convicted terrorist, resulted in the death of two civilians and the wounding of three others. Khan was shot dead by police; he was a supporter of Al-Muhajiroun.

== 2019 weapons depot ==
In 2019, a storage of weapons linked to al-Muhajiroun was found in Coventry. It included a sniper rifle and tracer rounds.

== See also ==
- UK Islamist demonstration outside Danish Embassy
