= Hizb ut-Tahrir Britain =

British chapter of pan-Islamist organisation Hizb ut-Tahrir

Hizb ut-Tahrir Britain حزب التحرير
- Leader: Abdul Wahid
- Founder: Global founder, Taqiuddin al-Nabhani
- Ideology: Hizb ut-Tahrir internationally Pan-Islamism; Islamism; Muslim supremacism Caliphalism; Salafism; Jihadism; Anti-secularism; Anti-Western sentiment Anti-Hindu sentiment Anti-Christian sentiment Anti-nationalism; Antisemitism; Anti-Zionism; Anti-democracy; Anti-liberalism; Anti-capitalism (Note: The group oppose both communism and capitalism. From their constitution: "Article 128: The disposal of property is restricted by the permission of the Legislator, i.e., Allah, (swt) whether it is spending or investing of property. Squandering, extravagance and miserliness are forbidden. Also forbidden are the capitalist companies, co-operatives, all other illegal transactions, usury (riba), fraud, monopolies, gambling and the like".); Anti-communism; Anti-feminism "Hizb ut-Tahrir Constitution" (self‑declared)
- Political position: Far-right; Non-aligned; Theocratic
- Religion: Sunni Islam

Flag

Hizb ut-Tahrir Britain (also known as HT Britain, HTB, HT in the UK, and HTUK) is the official name of the United Kingdom branch of Hizb ut-Tahrir, a transnational, pan-Islamist and fundamentalist group that seeks to re-establish "the Islamic Khilafah (Caliphate)" as an Islamic "superstate" where Muslim-majority countries are unified and ruled under Islamic Shariah law, and which eventually expands globally to include non-Muslim states such as Britain. (Note: From HT pamphlet: "In the forthcoming days the Muslims will conquer Rome and the dominion of the Ummah of Muhammad (peace and blessings be upon him and his family) will reach the whole world and the rule of the Muslims will reach as far as the day and night. And the Dīn of Muhammad (saw) will prevail over all other ways of life including Western Capitalism and the culture of Western Liberalism".) (Note: Founder An-Nabhani describes expansion in terms of following the example of the early Muslim Salaf's invasion and conquest of Persia and Byzantium: "she struck them both [Persia and Byzantium] simultaneously, conquered their lands and spread Islam over almost the whole of the inhabited parts of the world at that time, then what are we to say about the Ummah today; numbering more than one billion, ... She would undoubtedly constitute a front which would be stronger in every respect than the leading superpowers put together.) The group was designated a proscribed terrorist organization in the UK in January 2024.

The Home Office of the UK government describes HTB as "radical, but to date non-violent Islamist group" that "holds anti-semitic, anti-western and homophobic views"; a BBC programme described the party's website as promoting "racism and anti-Semitic hatred", calling "suicide bombers martyrs", and urging "Muslims to kill Jewish people". As in other countries, HT preaches that re-establishing the caliphate is a religious obligation of Muslims, that Western countries are waging war against Islam, that "democracy", patriotic feeling for, assimilation into, or voting in a non-Muslim country/society are forbidden in Islam.

In Britain, the party describes itself as "focused on directing Muslims to make a positive contribution to society whilst preserving their Islamic identity", according to an HT Media Pack issued after talk of proscribing the party developed. In its work with non-Muslims, the party states it has engaged in panel discussions that "have helped to overcome the intellectual entrenchment" that characterises "most of today's debate" between Muslim and non-Muslim cultures, and hopes that its advancement of "Islamic values and culture" will make a contribution towards "solving" Western society's problems of "racism, alcohol abuse, substance misuse, family breakdown, sexual abuse and the decline in morality". The party seeks out young Muslims (15-18-years old), attracting interest by offering football, trips, workshops, and residential after-school homework club. (Note: Written testimony from HTB former activists C & D (anonymous: 8 February 2008).) Potential party members start with the study of party texts in "Halaqa" study circles.

As of 2007, HTB "dominate[d]" the Islamist "scene" in Britain with an estimated 8,500 members (compared to only 1,000 for the rival, Muslim Association of Britain) according to a report in Foreign Affairs Journal. However, two years later, another report estimated HTB to be much smaller, with only approximately 2000 activists—the most active numbering approximately 100–200. HTB conferences in 2002 and 2003 drew over 6,000 people, but a 2009 HTB conference was attended by "no more" than 1000 people.

As of mid-2015, a British GP known by the pseudonym "Abdul Wahid" was the leader of HT Britain. According to an ex-member, as of 2006, HTB was funded by private donations and membership revenue – members typically donating ten percent of their income to the party.

In January 2024, the government declared its intention to designate Hizb ut-Tahrir as a proscribed terrorist organization; the group was formally banned on 19 January after parliamentary approval.

== Significance ==
Unlike many other countries, the United Kingdom has historically not banned Hizb ut-Tahrir, making the country "vital" and "nerve center" for the global HT movement, according to some (ex-member Ed Husain and Centre for Social Cohesion). The UK gives HT "access to the global media", provides a "fertile recruiting ground at mosques and universities" and a location for the production of its leaflets and books for global distribution. (Note: One example of such publications is a monthly bulletin published by HTUK called "Ong al-Waie" intended for distribution in Indonesia.) According to Zeyon Baran, HT's "London-based headquarters oversees HT activities in Muslim countries," and the global party's "supreme legislative body" (kiedat), is located in London and surrounding cities of high Muslim concentration -- "Birmingham, Bradford and Sheffield". An HT Media Pack denies this, stating that the party's leadership and the "main area" of its "political work" is in the Muslim world and that it is "untrue" that UK branch is among HT's "most important", or that Britain "serves as the base for much of HT's leadership".

In at least one HT text the UK is also known as the land of the "arch enemies of Islam". Abdul Qadeem Zallum, HT global leader from 1977 to 2003, writes:

... when the discerning and sincere people say that the British are the head of Kufr [Unbelief] among all the other Kufr states, they mean exactly that, for they are indeed the head of Kufr and they are the arch enemies of Islam. The Muslims should indeed harbour hatred for the British and a yearning for revenge over them...

== Organization and membership ==
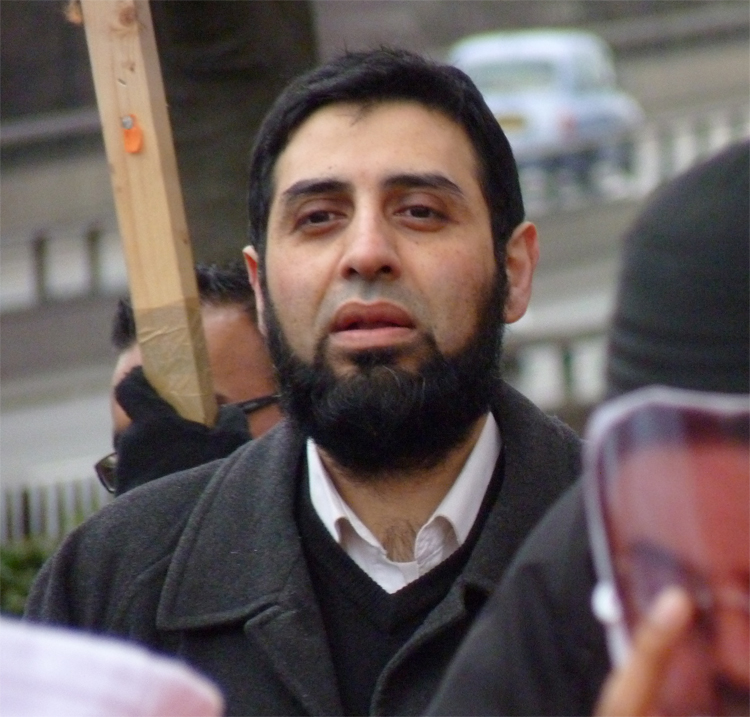
Dr Abdul Wahid - Leader of HT Britain

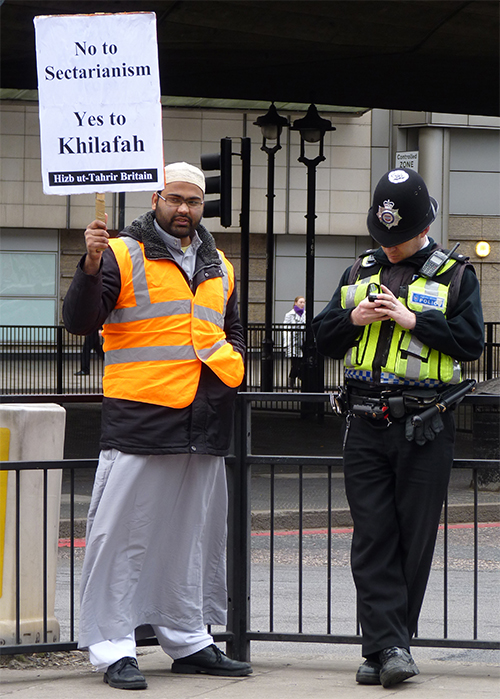
Hizb ut-Tahrir UK protestor, London 2011

Abdul Wahid (a pseudonym) was the leader of HT Britain, chairman of its executive committee as of mid-2015. In the global HT organization, HT Britain does not constitute not a "Vilaya" or province, but is "a branch that is entrusted with its own administrative affairs", according to its former UK head Jalaluddin Patel. An executive committee is charged with executing the administrative affairs for HTB. As of 2004, the executive committee had nine members who were elected every two years.

An HT Britain Media Pack describes HT membership as "men and women, young and old, from different walks of life and from different ethnic backgrounds", many having "senior roles in IT, economics, medicine, teaching, engineering".

=== Member motivation ===
One ex-member described factors contributing to radicalization of Muslims in Britain as

A heightened perception of Muslims and Muslim countries being unjustly attacked (Gulf War I and II, Afghan war, Palestine, Chechnya.) Double standards exhibited by the UN and USA with respect to Israel. Political Islam, being touted as a panacea for the Muslims' problems. A lack of alternative scholarly voices advocating more traditional responses to state oppression and increased media awareness due to proliferation of Islamic literature on the internet.

Sadek Hamid quoted one ex-member of HT:

HT filled a void for the young intellectually frustrated youth who had been told that Islam is the truth and they must pray and fast by people who couldn't explain why. By HT `proving` that Freedom, Democracy and Capitalism are defective, and that we Muslims are better than those kaffirs, it restored some of the loss of faith in the relevance of the religion.

Psychologically, HT provided "the attraction of being part of an elite group, who appeared intellectual", the feeling "of being part of something big" that was "going somewhere". Sadek Hamid describes the "overriding appeal of HT in the 1990s as 'the absence of able alternative Islamic leadership', with other groups with other Islamic groups appearing 'inarticulate, weak or compromising the militant message of Islam.'" HT provided an alternative to "petty local politicking" and a "drift" towards secularism of the Muslim community.

As well as a religio-political focal point, the tight-knit HT community provided friendships, mutual support, and marriage partners. More superficially, Sadek Hamid notes "many young people were attracted to HT entirely due to their slick appearance," the members "distinct .. almost uniform-like appearance"—distinct hijab styles and jilbabs for women and "men in casual jackets and designer-stubble beards".

The party lost membership by its lack of progress towards the creation of a caliphate. The failure of rumored military takeovers by pro-caliphate forces to materialize in Pakistan, or other countries, disillusioned some of the younger members.

== Views and criticism ==
As in other countries, HT preaches that working to establish the caliphate is a religious obligation (fard) of Muslims; that America, Britain and the West are waging war against Islam; that democracy is a "system of kufr (unbelief)" that Muslims are "forbidden to adopt, implement or call for"; that patriotism (e.g. loyalty to Britain), assimilation into a non-Muslim society, or voting in democratic elections are also forbidden. The party also seeks the destruction of Israel.

Hizb ut-Tahrir preaches that Muslims in Britain should not think of themselves as Muslim and "British", only Muslim. (HTB pamphlets have declared that is haram (forbidden) for Muslims to vote in the British elections, because Britain is not ruled according to Shariah law and participation in "secular politics" would lead to assimilation in British society.)

In an HT promotional video shown on BBC News an HTB representative declared:

I think Muslims in this country need to take a long, hard look at themselves and decide what is their identity. Are they British or are they Muslim? I am a Muslim. Where I live, is irrelevant.

Public campaigns by HT in Britain have included:

- "Stand for Islam"—created "in response" to alleged "relentless attacks on the Islamic laws, values and beliefs" and in opposition to government counter-terrorism measures and counter-radicalisation programmes, and
- SREIslamic—a campaign against elements of the sex and relationship education (SRE) curriculum in primary schools.

In a 2004 interview, HT leader Jalaluddin Patel described the party's work as re-establishing the Khilafah state through "intellectual and political work". In Britain this had "two levels":

1. explaining to the Muslim community their "duty to work for the Khilafah (Caliphate) state", to not lose their Islamic identity living in the West and to project a positive image of Islam in Western society.
2. and articulating to "wider community" of non-Muslims in "numerous conferences, seminars and debates", the cause of the Muslim world, presenting "a case for the Khilafah state as a valid model for the Muslim world" and explaining Islam as a political and intellectual system.

However, critics (Houriya Ahmed and Hannah Stuart of the research group Centre for Social Cohesion (Note: authors of a 167-page report on HT - Hizb ut-Tahrir, Ideology and Strategy)) complain that HT Britain is engaged in an effort to "mainstream" its ideology and downplay its more intolerant beliefs with "euphemistic language" for the benefit of the non-Muslim majority government and population of the state it operates in. Despite this attempt to "soften" its image and represent itself as a "non-violent", "intellectual" (Note: examples of an emphasis on the "intellectual" approach: "[Muhammad] intellectually addressed the ills in the society through debate and discussion and showed how Islam can bring a just and civilised society for humankind. Similarly we must embark on an intellectual path of dawah to the non-Muslims around us. This will help people understand why Muslims are trying so hard to end the chaos in our lands and establish the Islamic Khilafah State there. To do this we must learn about our deen, and engage with the non-Muslims who are being fed lies and propaganda on a daily basis. Let us respond to their emotional attacks with intellectual arguments from Islam.; "Hizb ut-Tahrir emphasised that it was not encouraging jihad - that it was a political and intellectual movement." (a former HT activist)) alternative to democracy and capitalism, has not involved modifying its ideology, Ahmed and Stuart insist, HT remains committed to a legal system that violates international norms of human rights, and an ideology of jihad, including plans for militarily expanding its proposed Islamic super-state by taking over non-Muslim countries. Ahmed and Stuart contrast the statement by HT Britain head Abdul Wahid that, ‘the party considers violence or armed struggle against the regime a violation of the Islamic Shari’ah’, with the claims of Abdul Qadeem Zallum, the head of Global HT for over two decades, that apostasy from Islam or seceding from the Caliphate must be stopped even if it means killing ‘millions’.

An alternative view is that HT has made an ideological shift and that the UK government has "achieved a considerable measure of success" in pressuring the party to moderate and pragmatise its approach. According to university lecturer Noman Hanif, arguing circa 2006, "the threat of proscription" under Anti-Terrorism legislation and the help of "compliant" former HT members "in the media", has led to HT's modifying its principle of "democracy is Kufr (non-Islamic)". In the May 2006 local election in the UK, the party did not call on its members to refrain from voting.(However, in later 2010 and 2015 Elections HT Britain did declare voting haram/forbidden.)

=== Alleged connection to terrorism ===
According to Michael Whine, a "partial list" of "terrorists who were also HT members and/or influenced by its teachings" in Britain includes:

Faisal Moustafa, Shafihur Rehman and Iftikar Sattar, who in 1995 were arrested and charged with conspiring to assassinate the Israeli ambassador, were reported to have been in possession of HT literature and to have helped organize HT meetings in Manchester. (Moustafa was again arrested in November 2000, but acquitted of terrorism charges—though his co-defendant, Moinul Abedin, was sentenced to twenty years). Omar Khan Sharif and Asif Hanif, the Mike's Place suicide bombers, had contact with HT before moving on to more extreme organisations. Mohammad Babar, who is linked to the seven men currently on trial in London on charges of planning terrorist attacks between January 2003 and April 2004, has stated that he was a member of HT while in college. Imam Ramee, an American, spoke on behalf of HT while living in Manchester, and was the featured speaker at the HT organized Muslim Unity Action March against the war in Iraq on March 15, 2003. He was reportedly an associate of Abu Hamza, and is said to have preached to "shoe bomber" Richard Reid, along with Hanif and Sharif, at the North London Mosque in Finsbury Park.

== Proscription ==
In January 2024, the UK government, pending parliamentary approval, has designated the group a proscribed terrorist organization under the Terrorism Act 2000. Home Secretary James Cleverly presented a draft order to Parliament for the proscription of the group on 15 January 2024, stating that: "Hizb ut-Tahrir is an antisemitic organisation that actively promotes and encourages terrorism, including praising and celebrating the appalling 7 October attacks. The group's praise of the attacks as well as describing Hamas as heroes on their website constituted promoting and encouraging terrorism". On January 19, 2024, the proscription came into effect. 2024.

Expressing support for or being a member of Hizb ut-Tahrir will be a criminal offense punishable by up to 14 years in prison. The decision comes after the group organized rallies following Hamas' terror attack on Israel, featuring chants of "jihad". The group denies supporting Hamas and advocating violence.

=== Past threats of proscription ===
On at least two occasions, political leaders in the UK have announced plans to proscribe HT for extremism.

Following the 7 July 2005 London bombings the British government announced its intention to ban the organization but later abandoned these. According to The Independent, Prime Minister Blair "shelved the ban after warnings from police, intelligence chiefs, and civil liberties groups that it is a non-violent group, and driving it underground could backfire", and according to The Observer because the Home Office believed a legal ban would not stick.

In July 2007, Leader of the Opposition David Cameron asked the then new Labour Prime Minister Gordon Brown why the organisation had not been banned from the United Kingdom, arguing it was an extremist group. John Reid the previous home secretary pointed out that two earlier reviews of the group had found insufficient evidence to justify a ban. Jeremy Corbyn, who would himself later become Leader of the Opposition, at the time called such legislation "misguided", arguing that it would "end up entrapping the innocent and preventing legitimate debate."

At the 2009 Conservative Party conference, Shadow Home Secretary Chris Grayling told members that HT would be proscribed should the Conservatives win the next election, and in that year David Cameron again "upbraided" Gordon Brown for not banning the HT. The 2010 Tory election manifesto stated that a Conservative government would "ban any organisation which advocates hate or the violent overthrow of our society, such as Hizb-ut-Tahrir." In May 2010 the Conservative Party was elected to office and Cameron became prime minister. The Guardian reported that "as recently as" May 2011 Cameron "was explicit" about his desire to see the party banned. But in July 2011 a report submitted to parliament by David Anderson QC, the independent reviewer of terrorism legislation, stated that Anderson does "not recommend changes to the system for proscription".

However, in an August 2011 commentary entitled "What does Hizb ut-Tahrir climb-down tell us about our prime minister?", opposition Labour MP Toby Perkins stated: "When former home secretary Alan Johnson marked a year of Tory rule by asking Mr Cameron about the ban, the PM equivocated and in subsequent replies to questions from Ian Austin and myself his stance has got noticeably weaker still."

Cameron's party was re-elected in May 2015 and a month later the Guardian reported that he was planning to "press ahead" with a counter-extremism strategy that would includes blacklisting "extremists" "from appearing on the airwaves and speaking at universities", and hinting that the "first group" to be banned could be Hizb ut-Tahrir.

A Hizb ut-Tahrir Media Information Pack quotes a variety sources opposing proscription—local student unions (Middlesex University Student's Union), Muslim organization leaders (Muslim Council of Britain, FoSIS) police officers (Bob Beckley) -- or finding no reason for the ban (Association of Chief Police Officers), or no evidence of terrorist activity (Verdict Turkish Second State Security Court).

== History ==
=== Founding ===
Hizb ut-Tahrir Britain was started in the early 1980s and led by a Palestinian. In 1986 Syrian-born Omar Bakri Muhammad took charge of the then very small group and led it until 1996 by which time it was starting to make an impact.

HT first recruited from among Muslims who came from countries where the party was banned and were temporary residents of the UK. After 1993 the party expanded its targets for recruitment to include second generation Muslim immigrants.

According to journalist Faisal al Yafai, by the mid-1990s, Hizb was "a fixture on university campuses, organising societies and debates. Its rhetoric was fierce and angry." The group was known for holding meetings following a format where a speaker from the group would expand on a subject for "around 40 minutes. The audience, almost always students and professionals in their 20s and 30s, listen and then pepper the speaker with questions". In general it did not engage with other Muslim organizations or initiatives at that time.

According to one ex-Hizb ut-Tahrir leader Maajid Nawaz, some young members were encouraged to engage in vigilantism against non Muslims and secular Muslim women:

We were encouraged by Omar Bakri to operate like street gangs and we did, prowling London, fighting Indian Sikhs in the west and African Christians in the east. We intimidated Muslim women until they wore the hijab and we thought we were invincible.

By the mid-1990s the party's activism had attracted the unflattering attention of the mainstream British press. In 1994 the Guardian quoted HT pamphlet as urging Muslims, "throw a stone, trigger a bomb, plant mine, hijack a plane, do not ask how", and "the believers fight the Jews and kill them;" and reported that many mosque officials felt "besieged" by HT party activists who were leafleting mosques, condemning local imams who advocated tolerance and integration. The party issued literature with provocative titles such as "Peace with Israel - A Crime Against Islam" and "Battlefield - The only Place for Muslims and Jews". In 1994, Channel 4 broadcast The Tottenham Ayatollah suggesting Omar Bakri Muhammad was (according to Sadek Hamid) "an affable fool".

In 1995, the then-President of the National Union of Students (NUS), declared HTB as ‘the single biggest extremism threat in the UK at the moment’, and the NUS and the Association of University Teachers called on the Department for Education and Employment and the Home Office to ban HTB. The NUS published a survey of calls made to "Campus Watch", (a 24-hour hotline set up by the NUS and an anti-fascist organisation "Searchlight") which found that over 70% of the calls received concerned HTB activism against Jews, Hindus and homosexuals.

The party then "went silent" according to al Yafai. Another source (Ahmed & Stuart) describes HTB has making a "tactical" retreat from 1996 to 2001. In 1996, Zallum, HT's global leader at the time, reportedly ordered Bakri to cease "controversial public rallies and combative debates on campuses". Bakri split with Hizb ut-Tahrir, and founded another Islamist organization Al-Muhajiroun.

=== 2001-2005 ===
In the aftermath of the 9/11 attacks HTB raised its profile, focusing on the death and destruction resulting from the US invasions of Iraq and Afghanistan, developing a theme of the inevitability of a ‘clash of civilisations’—the civilizations clashing being the "Capitalist Western civilisation" and Islam—and emphasising (what they and many Muslims believed) was Western "oppression" of Muslims.

According to an internal communique dated 2005, HT's post-9/11 strategy was to increase its activity within British Muslim communities, and to engaged with non-Muslims warning them "that the principles of Western culture do not solve the problems of society" which "are drowning in crime and corruption".

During this time HT members sent numerous communications to newspapers and Ofcom (the national regulatory body for broadcast media). These usually requested corrections to articles or disputed statements that HT was linked to violence or terrorism, and insisted that its work was "intellectual and political. The party considers violence or armed struggle against the regime a violation of the Islamic Shari’ah."

By 2003, the party had improved its public image in UK over that of its early years in 1990s, being described, for example, as a "Muslim political party" instead of a group of "Muslim fundamentalist" or "Islamic extremists". Plans to ban HT where opposed by British Muslim organizations, "across social, political and cultural affiliations", with one ban opponent wondering if proscription would mean that "expressions of support for people who are living under brutal military occupation" were in danger of being "outlawed".

A 2002 HTB conference in London drew 6,500 people, and a conference the next year in Birmingham drew 7,000. In 2003 an HT sponsored conference on shariah-based economics was described by the Birmingham Post as a place where "thousands of Muslim professionals will debate financial systems, values and ethics", with no suggestion that a separate financial system for Muslims was less than a mainstream practice or idea.

Muslims in Britain and throughout the world aspire to carry out their financial affairs in accordance with the principles of Islamic law. Muslims are forbidden from obtaining the various conventional mortgage and insurance products and services in the forms currently offered due to their incompatibility with the principles of Islamic law.

However criticism was not completely absent. An August 2003 BBC Newsnight report "discovered" that the HTB website "promotes racism and anti-Semitic hatred, calls suicide bombers martyrs, and urges Muslims to kill Jewish people." In 2004, the National Union of Students (NUS) Conference passed a motion applying its "No Platform Policy" to HT, claiming the party was "responsible for supporting terrorism and publishing material that incites racial hatred". HT avoided this boycott by using other names (Ideological Society (IS), at Queen Mary University of London) and by holding functions off campus and using a university official who was also an HT member to email students to advertise the function (in the case of debate at Birmingham University). A motion to revert the "No Platform" policy on HTB was supported by the umbrella group Federation of Student Islamic Societies (FOSIS) at the 2006 annual NUS conference.

Hijab and Shabina Begum

Among the issues the party was involved in was hijab for women. HT organised a demonstration by women in full hijab in front of the French embassy in London in protest against France's March 2004 law banning the wearing of religious symbols in state schools.

In 2005, Shabina Begum, a Luton student a sued her school over the right to wear a jilbab rather than the school uniform (shalwar kameez). Local Labour MPs accused her older brother (Shuweb Rahman) of support for HT and of engineering the case.

HTB Media Spokesperson Imran Wahid told the Sunday Times "Our members in Luton have consistently advised Shabina and her family to stand up for her right to an education and her right to observe the Islamic ordinances, including the wearing of the jilbab."

Begum was also invited to speak at an HTB conference, and an internal HTB email circulated to all women speakers before the event entitled her speech, ‘My struggle to maintain my identity with the Jilbab ban’.

=== Post 7/7 ===
Several terrorist attacks and attempted attacks from 2004 to 2007 (Note: The fertilizer bomb plot of 2004, the London bombings of 7 and 21 July 2005, the alleged airline bomb plots of August 2006, the botched bomb attempts at Glasgow and London airports in June 2007.)—particularly the 7 July 2005 London bombings that killed over 50 civilians—raised government/media/public concern about Islamism in Britain. Drawing particular attention to Hizb ut-Tahrir were the departure of senior members (Note: Shiraz Maher, Rashad Ali, Dawud Masieh and Maajid Nawaz are all former HTB senior members who left the organisation and publicly challenged HT ideology soon after,) and critical memoirs by defectors (The Islamist by Ed Husain, Radical by Maajid Nawaz, "Why I left Hizb ut-Tahrir" by Umm Mustafa), and a provocative comment piece in the Guardian by an HT activist. A month after the 7/7 bombing the government stated its intention to ban HT Britain.

After July 2005 critics Ahmad, Stuart and Michael Whine argue the party again adjusted its strategy, presenting its ideology as a "non-violent" political alternative to "capitalism", downplaying its ‘intolerant’ doctrines to soften and mainstream its public image, while encouraging members to ‘keep your ideology in your heart’. The party explicitly condemned the bombings, (Note: In 2003, when asked to condemn suicide bombing, Imran Wahid, HTB's current chief media advisor told BBC, "The legitimate force is the Islamic army of the Islamic Caliphate. Muslims have the right to resist occupation and if that means that they have to undertake such actions [suicide attacks – original insertion], then we will never condemn that.") itself deleted dozens of its most out-spoken leaflets from its website, began working with other Muslim groups, championed grievances of British Muslims (sex education and Danish cartoons of Muhammad). It also allowed journalists into some of its meetings and granted some press interviews, and sought out events (Ahmad and Stuart allege) where it could "project" a "moderate" image.

Dilpazier Aslam and leaflets

In July 2005 Dilpazier Aslam, a 27-year-old member of Hizb ut-Tahrir and trainee journalist with The Guardian, lost his position with the newspaper, and sued it for unfair dismissal, leading to an undisclosed out-of-court settlement. Aslam had written a piece appearing in The Guardian Comment section following the 7/7 bombings entitled "We rock the boat: today's Muslims aren't prepared to ignore injustice", (where he called on the British public not to act "shocked" by the fact that the 7/7 attacks on civilians were by British-born Muslims, as the attacks were—he asserted—an inevitable result of the UK's foreign policy in Iraq and Afghanistan). The Guardian was criticized for not making clear that Aslam was a member of HT Britain. (The Comment editor had not been aware of this fact.) Citing the antisemitic statements discovered on the party's website ("the Jews are a people of slander ... a treacherous people ... they fabricate lies and twist words from their right places"), Guardian executives decided that membership of Hizb ut-Tahrir was not compatible with membership of the newspaper's trainee scheme. Aslam refused to leave the group, saying he was not an antisemite and did not consider Hizb ut-Tahrir's website to be antisemitic. He was then dismissed and filed a lawsuit.

Between late 2005 and early 2006 the party removed 200+ leaflets from its website, leaving about 30. (Note: Archived versions of HTB's former official website (Khilafah.com) shows that on 26 June 2005 and 30 September 2005 HTB hosted 256 leaflets, the oldest of which dates to 20 August 1999. On 16 March 2006, however, the Khilafah.com website hosted only 30 leaflets.) HTB leader Abdul Wahid explained

The decision to remove some of our overseas literature from our British website was a considered response to the legitimate proposition that people who read it out of its context might see it as offensive.

Critics (Ahmed & Stuart) alleged that many of the leaflets hosted by HTB were openly antisemitic or anti-Western, (with one alleging that the US government was complicit in the 9/11 attacks,) and that the removal was a tactical maneuver to improve HT's public image in the aftermath of the 7/7 attacks and the government's proposed proscription of HT, and ‘not because the party has in any way changed its ideology’.

Community activities

During this time the party also began engaging with other Muslim groups and Muslim-led events or initiatives from which it had previously held aloof. HTB took a stall at the 2007 Global Peace and Unity conference at the London's ExCeL Exhibition Centre, organised by Islam Channel, and tried (but was not allowed) to participate at the 2009 Hounslow Muslim Forum. (Note: Cllr. Peter Thompson told the local newspaper, Hounslow Chronicle: ‘The use of publicly-owned premises such as your school by groups holding extreme religious, ideological or political views, who aim to create or exploit grievances and community tensions to the detriment of the whole community, should not be permitted.’) Yusuf Patel, an HT member and brother of former HTB leader Jalaluddin Patel, spoke at a 2009 Muslim Education Conference in Birmingham. (Note: organised by the al-Hijrah Trust, a Muslim educational charity.) HT was active in local council-sponsored events such as the 2009 Camden Bangladeshi Mela in London where the group MCRCIA (Muslim Community Representatives Camden & Islington Association (MCRCIA)) introduced festival goers to party teachings, (i.e. Islam being "a complete legal, political, economic and social system"; using article 68 of HT's draft constitution to describe ‘Islam Judicial System’, "clarifying ... issues such ‘Women in Islam’, ‘Shari’ah Law’ and ‘The Caliphate".) Several (now defunct) small local organizations set up by HT include Inspire Youth Association (IYA), Newgen Community Forum, Brick Lane Islamic Circle (BLIC). Members set up two primary schools in Slough, Berkshire and in Haringey, North London, managed by the Islamic Shakhsiyah Foundation (ISF). In February 2008, HT head Abdul Wahid won a debate at London Borough of Tower Hamlets with 78 per cent of the audience voting in favor of his resolution that political participation in Britain had "failed British Muslims" and that they should reject democracy and concentrate on initiatives such as building madrassas and mosques.

Critics and media

The party also continued to come under the spotlight of the media and critics. According to Sadek Hamid, the party developed a "reputation for deceptive opportunism to gain access and exploit the goodwill of other Muslims", by, for example participating in activities without mentioning that they were from HTB. Ahmed and Stuart complained that at the Muslim Education Conference, promotional material found space to describe Yusuf Patel as an education "campaigner... leading a national campaign, evidencing the deep opposition within the Muslim community against the government's proposals to make sex education statutory from the age of five"—but not to mention his connection with HT.

Ahmed and Stuart also complained HT was attempting to "mainstream" its message and "conflate" grievances of local Muslim population with HT's own Islamist causes of sharia law, caliphate and opposing Muslim integration into British society. At the Camden Bangladeshi Mela, the MCRCIA made no mention of the fact that the "Islamic principles" it taught were HT doctrine, not the consensus of the Islamic scholars or community.

In the news media, critics (such as Lila Green writing in The Independent), wondered if Yusuf Patel and SREIslamic might "like other far-right or religious groups in Britain, ... be using a sensitive community grievance to pursue a wider political agenda", and worried that "it was hard to tell whether Patel is constructively engaging in local democracy or stirring up tension." The Shakhsiyah Foundation and its two schools became subject of stories in the Sunday Times and Opposition attacks on the Government. Opposition leader (at the time) David Cameron claiming that government Pathfinder fund—aimed at combating violent extremism—was being used to fund schools "run by an organisation with links to extremism", i.e. Hizb ut-Tahrir. (He later acknowledged that the government fund providing money to the schools was different from the Pathfinder fund aimed at combating violent extremism.)

In November 2006, the BBC Newsnight documentary investigating Hizb ut-Tahrir caused HT to issue a press releases alleging "baseless ... sensationalist allegations" and political motivations to "defam[e] our public image", and that its lawyers had been "instructed ... to commence legal proceedings against the BBC following the broadcast of defamatory allegations." The BBC noted that it had received "many emails of complaint" about the broadcast accusing BBC of attempting to discredit Hizb ut-Tahrir, but stated that in regard to the general question of the "radicalisation of British Muslim youth" in mosques, universities and on the internet, the File on Four/Newsnight project had found allegations of multiple reliable sources (Note: Sheikh Musa Admani, Imam at the London Metropolitan University, Shuaib Yusaf, a trustee at Croydon mosque, a former Hizb ut-Tahrir supporter called Jawad and an anonymous undercover researcher who we called J, who has attended Hizb ut-Tahrir meetings.) which directly contradicted the Hizb ut tahrir's "publicly stated position" and "are serious and worthy of examination".

In the 2008 Tower Hamlets debate, the East London Advertiser reported debater and HT head Abdul Wahid's emphasis on importance of upholding of religion obedience over freedom of speech, his attack on Muslim MPs such as Sadiq Khan who voted for gay rights and failed to defend Sharia laws, and on Muslims for "selling out" their morals and principles by joined mainstream political parties. A debater on the other side (Lord Ahmed) complained that HT "just packed the room with their own supporters." As a result of criticism over allowing Abdul Wahid to participate, the Tower Hamlets council compelled the Cordoba Foundation—the event organisers—to return some of the funding provided by the council.

Recent reports

The 2009 HTB conference was attended by no more than 1000 people, and the early 2011 or late 2010 conference in Tower Hamlets reportedly had a turnout of only 200 people, down from the 6000+ conferences of 2002 and 2003. As of 2015, one unsympathetic source—the anti-Islamist Quilliam Foundation—describes the party as "far less influential than it was".

== Prominent members ==
- Abdul Wahid: HTB Executive Chairman [current]
- Nasim Ghani: HTB Chairman [current leader]
- Farid Kassim: HTB's first Deputy Leader and Spokesperson
- Jamal Harwood: HTB Head of Legal Affairs
- Nazreen Nawaz: HTB Women's Media Representative
- Akmal Ashgar: HTB member, head of New Civilisation think tank
- Dilpazier Aslam: HTB member and former Guardian newspaper journalist
- Sajjad Khan: HTB Chief Political Advisor, former leader
- Omar Bakri Mohammed: HTB former leader [1986-1996]; founder of al-Muhajiroun [1996, UK]
