= Umran Javed =

British terrorist

Umran Javed (born 1979) is a former spokesman for Al-Muhajiroun, a designated and banned terrorist organisation. A British court found Javed guilty of soliciting to murder and inciting racial hatred for repeatedly chanting "bomb, bomb, USA," "bomb, bomb, Denmark," "we want Danish blood!," "UK you will pay!," said Abu Musab al-Zarqawi "would be coming back," and "7/7 on its way!" outside the Danish embassy following the Jyllands-Posten Muhammad cartoons controversy.

Six weeks after the protest British police raided Javed's home and found a pamphlet entitled Kill Them by the Sword Wherever They Are, a pamphlet printed by Al Ghurabaa, a designated terrorist organisation.

When Javed chanted "bomb, bomb, USA" he did so in front of a crowd of 300 people, many of whom held placards saying, "Behead those who insult Islam." Javed later said in his defence that he did not advocate literally bombing the United States. Prosecutor David Perry told jurors, "This was not simply a demonstration about cartoons. It was a recruitment for terror... If you shout out, 'Bomb, bomb Denmark; bomb, bomb USA', there is no doubt about what you intend your audience to understand." The jury voted ten to one to convict Javed. At the Old Bailey on 18 July 2007, Judge Brian Barker QC sentenced Javed to six years in prison.

When the jury foreman announced Javed had been found guilty of soliciting murder and inciting racial hatred his family and friends yelled, "Allahu Akbar, curse the judge, curse the court, curse the jury."
