= Abdul Rahman Saleem =

British Islamist

Abdul Rahman Saleem (born Rahman Yahyaei), also known as Abu Yahya, is a British Islamic activist, born around 1975.

== Early life and education ==
Saleem was born in Mashhad, Iran in 1975 to a Punjabi Sunni family. He left Iran for London in 1979 following the Iranian Revolution where he was bullied and discriminated against for his South Asian identity. This provoked his embracement of radical Islam and later he became closely acquainted with Al-Muhajiroun members Omar Bakri and Anjem Choudary. Nonetheless, he excelled in his studies, earning 11 A* Grades at GCSE and 5 A grades at A Level in English literature, Persian, Further Mathematics, Mathematics and Physics. Despite this, he opted to attend university in Iran and was granted a placement at Sharif University of Technology to study mechanical engineering in 1993. He graduated in 1998 and returned to the United Kingdom the following year.

== Career ==
He is a former Al Muhajiroun spokesman, a former member of the Saved Sect, and was a prominent member of al-Maddad, an organisation that claims to have sent dozens of British Muslims to fight in Chechnya and elsewhere. In August 2001, he went to secret camps in Pakistan and Afghanistan and trained in the use of guns and explosives.

He lives in Poplar, London. He is the father of five children and works for British Telecom as an engineer.

On 18 November 2005 he attended the founding of Ahlus Sunnah wal Jamaah.

He participated in the Islamist demonstration outside the Danish Embassy in London in 2006, where he chanted "Europe you will pay with your blood" and "Denmark, USA, 7/7 on its way" through a megaphone, and he was charged with using words likely to stir up racial hatred and released on bail to appear at West London Magistrates' Court on 31 March 2006 On 1 February 2007, he was found guilty, and will be held until his sentencing in April.

He was found guilty of Incitement to Terrorism Overseas by a unanimous verdict, and found not guilty of Terrorist Fundraising by a majority verdict on 17 April 2008 at Kingston upon Thames Crown Court. He gave a series of speeches at the Regent's Park Mosque, the DVD of which was discovered at the former residence of Omar Bakri in 2006. He was sentenced the following day to three years imprisonment.
