= 2006 Islamist demonstration outside the Embassy of Denmark in London =

Protest held in England

The 2006 Islamist demonstration outside the Embassy of Denmark in London took place on 3 February 2006, in response to controversy surrounding the publication of editorial cartoons depicting the Islamic prophet Muhammad in the Danish newspaper Jyllands-Posten on 30 September 2005. The extremist UK-based Islamist groups al Ghurabaa and The Saviour Sect staged a controversial protest march from London Central Mosque near Marylebone Station to the Danish Embassy near Knightsbridge Underground station.

== Al Ghurabaa call Muslims to protest ==
Al Ghurabaa published an article on their website entitled, "Kill those who insult the Prophet Muhammad". The article states, "The insulting of the Messenger Muhammad is something that the Muslims cannot and will not tolerate and the punishment in Islam for the one who does so is death". Then on 31 January 2006 they issued a press release calling "all Muslims to rise & defend the honour of the Messenger Muhammad."

They stated that the "Islamic verdict on individuals who insult any Prophet needs to be passed by an Islamic court and implemented by the Islamic State" but go on to explain how they believe the "55 Muslim countries in existence today all implement non-Islamic law and their insults to the Messenger Muhammad are worse than what appears in the newspapers....Clearly were it not for the fact that they fear being overthrown by an angry Muslim population, not a word would have been mentioned about the current incident from the leaders of Saudi Arabia, Egypt, Bahrain, Pakistan, Kuwait, etc".

== The protest ==
The protest occurred on Friday 3 February. The Metropolitan Police stated in a briefing that 450 protesters attended the Friday demonstration, 3,500 attended on Saturday in protests by other groups.

Some protesters waved placards reading slogans such as "Massacre those who insult Islam", "Butcher those who mock Islam", "Be prepared for the real holocaust", "Europe you will pay, your 9/11 is on the way", or "7/7 is on its way"; "Europe you will pay, Bin Laden is on his way", "Freedom go to hell" and "Europe you'll come crawling, when the Mujahideen come roaring". Despite the similar theme on al Ghurabaa's website, their spokesman, Anjem Choudary, said he did not know who wrote the placards.

Bricklaying student Omar Khayam, 22, from Bedford, was photographed wearing a garment resembling a suicide bomber's jacket outside the Danish Embassy. Police tried to stop press photographers from taking pictures of Omar in the 'bomb vest'. Omar said he had no regrets about his style of dress, telling the Daily Express, "I didn't go there to cause anyone any harm. I went along just to attend a protest. Yet I have been branded a suicide bomber overnight. Did I say, 'Kill Jews?' No. Did I have racist signs on me? No. So why this reaction?" He went on, "Yes, I would do it again to make a point. I could have gone along and held up banners or something, but this made the point better".

Two men attended the protest to stage a counter-demonstration, handing out leaflets reading "Free speech or no free speech? You decide" and "Should these cartoons be banned?".

== Reactions ==
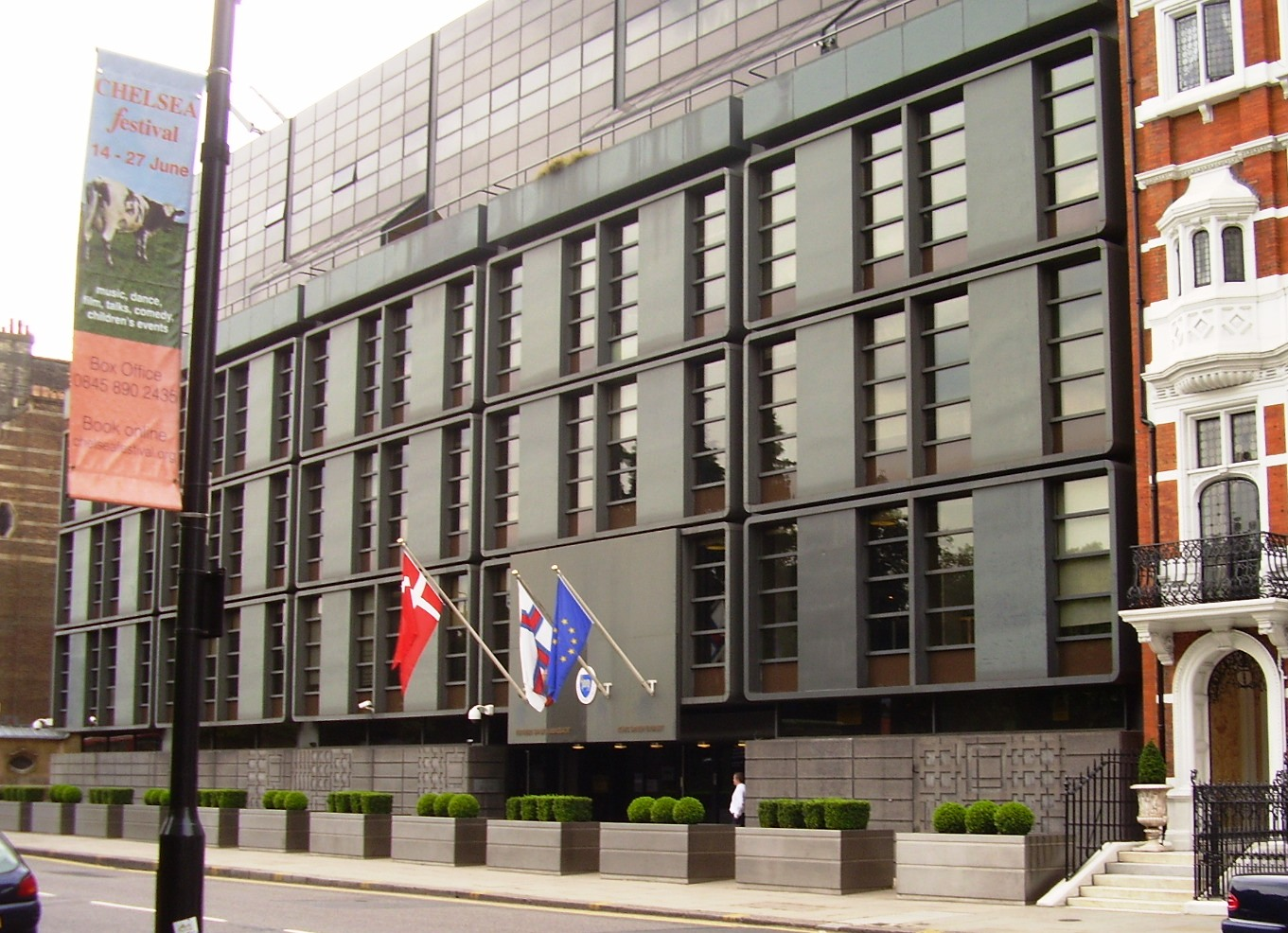
The Embassy of Denmark in London, pictured in 2008

David Davis, the Shadow Home Secretary, said that slogans such as "Massacre those who insult Islam" amounted to incitement to murder and that police should take "a no tolerance" approach to them. He told the Sunday Telegraph, "Clearly, some of these placards are incitement to violence and indeed incitement to murder." Dominic Grieve, the Conservative legal affairs spokesman, expressed concern that it could prove impossible to identify those responsible because arrests had not been made at the time. He said, "It is certainly not a happy state of affairs where such a demonstration takes place and those people who are acting in that way don't end up under arrest before the demonstration is ended."

David Winnick, on the Commons home affairs committee, said those carrying banners threatening violence should be prosecuted and, where possible, deported. "Those who are temporarily in Britain, the sooner they are out of the country the better," he said. "Those who have been given permission to live here, insofar as it is possible in law, it would be better for this country and indeed for the Muslim community if that right was removed." The Labour MP Shahid Malik, also on the committee, wrote to Sir Ian Blair, head of the Metropolitan Police, calling for prosecutions.

Tony Blair said, "There is a real sense of outrage....it is very important for our overall good relations in this country that people understand there is no political correctness that should prevent the police from taking whatever action they think is necessary". Simon Hughes, Liberal Democrat President states, "To forbid the freedom to offend is not compatible with modern multi-cultural societies. But inciting violence is always wrong and a crime. The leaders of the great faith communities should together make clear that the strength of their religions can withstand all attacks, satirical or otherwise. They should respond to attacks with frankness and clarity but never with hate or retaliation."

UK newspapers express disgust at Omar Khayam's protest and his picture made the front page of The Sun. Pictures of Khayam was among those studied by the Scotland Yard team, which also examined police CCTV and sound recordings to identify any offenders and pass on evidence of any offences to the Crown Prosecution Service.

The Metropolitan Police, under fire for the lack of arrests, issued a statement, "Those gathered were well natured and in the main compliant with police requests. Arrests, if necessary, will be made at the most appropriate time. This should not be seen as a sign of lack of action ... The decision to arrest at a public order event must be viewed in the context of the overall policing plan and the environment the officers are operating in. Specialist officers were deployed on both days to record any potential evidence should it be needed at any point in the future. All complaints will be passed to the public order crime unit for further investigation".

On 6 February, the Home Office requested briefing from the Metropolitan Police's Public Order Branch to provide assessment of two demonstrations. This document was later obtained by the BBC under the Freedom of Information Act and its contents were reported, including some controversial claims. The document states that the Saturday protesters "were encouraged by a large group of photographers and cameramen" although no news organisations or individual's names were given.

The protest was also condemned by the Muslim Public Affairs Committee UK, an organisation which encourages British Muslims to vote against politicians who support the Iraq war and/or Israel. MPACUK's leader Asghar Bukhari called for the arrest of the protest's leaders.

== Aftermath ==
=== Apology ===
On 6 February 2006, Omar Khayam, accompanied by the chairman of his local mosque and by Patrick Hall MP apologised "wholeheartedly" to the families of the July 2005 London bombings and said it had not been his aim to cause offence. He said, "Just because we have the right of free speech and a free media, it does not mean we may say and do as we please and not take into account the effect it will have on others. But by me dressing the way I did, I did just that, exactly the same as the Danish newspaper, if not worse."

In 2002 Khayam was jailed for possessing crack cocaine with intent to supply. Having been released on parole in 2005 after serving half of his six-year sentence, he was arrested the next morning for breaching his parole conditions, and returned to prison. The Daily Mirror interviewed an 'insider' who knew Khayam at Springhill Prison. Their source said,

He was a very quiet guy and would only ever speak out when he was with other extremists. He told people that he would use the money from drugs for the cause, meaning radical Muslim groups. He has obviously become even more radicalised since he got out. It was well known that Omar made a lot of money from drugs. He was part of a large crew in Bedford. His street name is Skinner and there are a lot of drug users in the town who know him through these connections. When he got involved with these groups linked to terror I think a lot of non-Muslim prisoners felt they didn't want much to do with him any more.

=== Glorification of terrorism debate ===
On 14 February 2006, the Muslim Council of Britain (MCB) urged Parliament to vote for the removal of the 'glorification of terrorism' clause from the Terrorism Bill. The MCB say the Bill is perceived as "unfairly targeting Muslims and stifling legitimate debate." Tony Blair managed to win the battle, banning the glorification of terrorism, by 315 to 277 votes. He said, "The new law will mean that if people are going to start celebrating acts of terrorism or condoning people who engage in terrorism, they will be prosecuted, and if they do not come from this country, they should not be in this country. We have free speech in this country, but you cannot abuse it."

William Hague, standing in for David Cameron, said at Prime Minister's Questions that the inclusion of "glorification" in the Bill was mere spin, an attempt to give the impression that tough action was being taken. "Wouldn’t it be better to have a watertight law designed to catch the guilty, rather than a press release law designed to catch the headlines?" he said. Tony Blair replied, "If we take out the word 'glorification' it sends a massive counter productive signal". Blair insisted that an offence of glorifying terror was the only way to prosecute demonstrators who carry banners praising the 7/7 bombers. He said that existing laws only allowed prosecutions for preaching hate by word of mouth, but not by the written word or through placards. Hague said that he was mistaken.

=== Criminal charges ===
There was considerable outcry at the perceived inaction on the part of the police to counter the protests. David Davis wrote to the Home Secretary stating that "[t]here is a clear public interest in ensuring that those who incite murder are appropriately dealt with and an equal public interest that there is no unnecessary delay. Furthermore, not to take action is to let down the moderate Muslim majority". It was reported that members of the public made more than 500 complaints to Scotland Yard about the demonstration.

The two charges of using either spoken or written words to cause intentional harassment, alarm or distress, under Section 5 of the Public Order Act 1986, carry a maximum sentence of 6 months' imprisonment, whereas those causing 'Racially Aggravated Intentional Harassment, Alarm Or Distress', under Section 31 of the Crime and Disorder Act 1998, carry a maximum sentence of 2 years' imprisonment.

On 7 March 2006, having reviewed 60 hours of footage from closed-circuit television, amongst other evidence, and after consultation with and authorisation by the Crown Prosecution Service, the Metropolitan Police announced, "We have been advised today that there are sufficient grounds to arrest individuals for offences under the Public Order Act. This includes offences that are racially or religiously aggravated".

On 15 March 2006, five men were arrested and charged for their roles in the protests; one of them was charged and held in custody, two were charged and released on police bail to attend court, and the remaining two were released on police bail for further inquiries. Further arrest were made in the following months and a total of six people have been criminally charged.

- Anjem Choudary, 39, was originally released on bail to return to a police station on 19 April "pending investigations into material recovered in searches". However, he was arrested again on 7 May at Stansted Airport and taken into custody at a London police station. Choudary was charged under the Public Order Act with organising a procession without the required written notification to the police. Choudary was the leader of al Ghurabaa and the "right-hand man of radical Muslim cleric, Omar Bakri Mohammed" who is banned from the UK.
- Abdul Muhid, was also bailed to return to a police station on 19 April after further enquiries. Muhid was arrested with Choudary again on 7 May at Stansted Airport. He was charged with two counts of soliciting to murder. On 7 March 2007 he was found guilty of both charges and later sentenced to six years in jail. Muhid is a prominent member of The Saviour Sect and was also arrested in 2005 after complaints that a man had called for British troops in Iraq to be killed and for homosexuals to be hurled from cliff tops, but the charges were dropped by the CPS due to there "not [being] a realistic prospect of conviction" because of problems of proving identity.
- Mizanur Rahman was charged with soliciting murder and inciting racial hatred. He was found guilty of inciting racial hatred in December 2006 where the same jury was unable to reach a verdict on the charge of soliciting murder, at a retrial in 2007 he was convicted on the soliciting murder charge as well. Rahman was sentenced to six years in jail.
- Umran Javed was charged with soliciting murder and inciting racial hatred and remanded in custody. He was denied bail and not asked to enter a plea. On 5 January 2007, he was found guilty of those charges. He was later sentenced to six years in jail.
- Omar Zaheer was charged with racially aggravated disorderly behaviour and disorderly behaviour and released on bail to appear at Bow Street Magistrates' Court on 31 March.
- Abdul Rahman Saleem was charged with using words likely to stir up racial hatred and released on bail to appear at West London Magistrates' Court on 31 March. On 1 February 2007, he was found guilty, and was later sentenced to four years in jail.

Omar Bakri Mohammed, speaking from Lebanon, issued a warning to Britain after a police raid on his London home, "I am warning the British government – you are playing with fire. Let them go to hell – all of them. Play with fire and you burn your fingers." He said his family was "terrified" as the police searched his London home, adding, "They took my computers".

== See also ==
- Islam
- Muhammad
- Timeline of the Jyllands-Posten Muhammad cartoons controversy
- International reactions to the Jyllands-Posten Muhammad cartoons controversy
- al Ghurabaa
- The Saviour Sect
- Hizb ut-Tahrir
- Al-Muhajiroun
- Islamism in London
