= Momin Khawaja =

Canadian terrorist (born 1979)

Mohammad Momin Khawaja (born April 14, 1979) is a Canadian found guilty of involvement in a plot to plant fertilizer bombs in the United Kingdom. While working as a software engineer under contract to the Foreign Affairs department in 2004 he became the first person charged and found guilty under the Canadian Anti-Terrorism Act following the proof that he communicated with British Islamists plotting a bomb attack. On March 12, 2009, Khawaja was sentenced to 10.5 years in prison and was eligible for parole five years into the prison term. On December 17, 2010, Khawaja's sentence was increased to life imprisonment by the Ontario Court of Appeals.

== Early life and education ==
Born in Ottawa, Ontario, to Pakistani immigrants Azra and Mahboob who had moved to Canada in 1967, Khawaja lived in Saudi Arabia with his family (ages 9–14), before moving back to Ottawa, where he attended Sir Wilfrid Laurier Secondary School and graduated in January 1998.

== Career ==
Following graduation, he entered a 3-year computer program at Algonquin College, and became more religious and began teaching youth at the Cumberland mosque. His April 2001 graduation led to a placement in the Gatineau office of HRDC.

In January 2002, Khawaja took a 3-month trip to stay with his uncle in Pakistan while looking for a potential wife. It was later alleged that this trip had been meant to join the Taliban. Upon returning unsuccessful, he took a job as a contracted software developer for the Department of Foreign Affairs.

== Terrorist activities ==
In summer 2003, the 24-year-old Khawaja began visiting paintball and pellet gun ranges with friends, signing in at the desk with pseudonyms. One friend, Younes Lasfar, got Khawaja to store two rifles and some ammunition at his house, and Khawaja complied, storing them under his bed. In July, he is alleged to have attended a four-day training camp in Pakistan's FATA region, along with Omar Khyam.

In October, Khawaja flew to Pakistan, and is alleged to have met with Khyam who gave him a medical kit, invisible ink set, cell phone SIM cards and cash, which he allegedly brought to Abu Munthir in Pakistan.

On October 19, Khawaja sent an email to Mohammed Junaid Babar, stating; "I will start on the remote devices thing right away and will let u know once we have it ready for testing and i find some of the things for testing. Urea, nitro phosphate, anything else we need?".

During this time, Khawaja also began corresponding with Zeba Khan after reading her articles on the internet, and arranged to once again travel to Pakistan to meet her, going out to dinner with her and Babar. On October 29, Khan announced that she was engaged to Khawaja, though later the couple decide to cancel the marriage but remain friends.

Prosecutors allege that the following month, the British-based group and Khawaja began discussing potential explosives to be used in the service of "jihad".

== Arrest, trial and sentencing ==
Khawaja was arrested on March 29, 2004, while his father was teaching at a university in Saudi Arabia, as part of a month-long sting operation entitled Operation Awaken that saw eight others, all of Pakistani heritage, arrested.

Ultimately five were convicted in London courts, and two were acquitted, while Babar agreed to testify against the others in exchange for full immunity for himself. Khawaja's ex-fiancée testified by videolink from Dubai.

The initial two charges against Khawaja were boosted to seven counts, following Babar's telling of events, and a publication ban prevented the media from reporting on details revealed during legal hearings.

Represented by attorney Lawrence Greenspon, Khawaja was told to expect a direct indictment leading to a trial beginning in 2006.

The trial began on June 23, 2008, heard by Superior Court judge Douglas Rutherford, prosecuted by David McKercher. He was charged with helping to develop bomb detonators, possession of explosives, helping to finance terrorist activity, receiving terrorist training and facilitating terrorism. He had pleaded not guilty on all charges, and the case was being heard without a jury. On October 29, 2008, he was found guilty on all charges by Justice Rutherford. On March 12, 2009, at his sentencing hearing, Rutherford sentenced Khawaja to 10.5 years in addition to the five years already served. Khawaja would be eligible for parole in five years.

== Issues and appeal ==
Greenspon, Khawaja’s lawyer, said a major problem comes when police launch investigations into whether someone might be a terrorist simply because of their religious or political beliefs. However, Federal prosecutor Nicholas Devlin argued that people do not develop prejudices against members of particular religions because of Criminal Code provisions such as the motive clause, which does not mention Muslims or any other group by name. "It is completely neutral," Devlin told the court. "This legislation would apply to someone who bombed Dr. (Henry) Morgentaler’s [abortion] clinic for some unknown reason. It would apply to [Oklahoma City bomber] Timothy McVeigh. It would apply to Islamic extremists."

The Canadian Government appealed the sentencing, asking for a longer sentence. The Supreme Court reviewed the Khawaja case to examine the constitutionality of the definition of "terrorist activity" in the criminal code. The main issue focuses on the motive clause, which states that terrorist activity is that committed, "in whole or in part for a political, religious or ideological purpose, objective or cause." At Khawaja’s trial, Rutherford ruled that the motive provision was unconstitutional, but still ordered the trial to proceed.

The original evidence from the case was also reviewed in the appeal. The following is taken directly from the Supreme Court of Canada Judgement:

– The facts underlying the offences were largely undisputed. Voluminous email correspondence attested in graphic detail to the appellant’s ideological commitment to violent "jihad" and to his acts in Canada and elsewhere to further jihad-inspired terrorist activities.

– While living with his siblings in Canada, the appellant became obsessed with Osama Bin Laden and his cause. The appellant began communicating with other people committed to violence in the name of Islam, some of whom he referred to as "the bros". He entered into covert email correspondence with Mohammed Junaid Babar, an American of Pakistani descent who eventually pleaded guilty in New York City to five counts of providing material support or resources to al Qaeda. He also communicated extensively with Omar Khyam, the leader of a terrorist cell based in London, England, who was convicted along with several co-conspirators of a plot to bomb targets in the U.K. and elsewhere in Europe.

– The appellant repeatedly offered Khyam and Babar support. He gave Khyam money for an explosives operation in the United Kingdom or elsewhere in Europe. He gave Babar cash, supplies and SIM cards so that Babar could contact Khyam when transporting detonators to Europe. He provided funds to support Babar, Khyam and "the bros" in their jihadist efforts. He designed a remote arming device for explosives that the police referred to as the "Hi-Fi Digimonster", and offered to smuggle it into the U.K. and train the U.K. cell on its use. He recruited a woman in Ottawa to facilitate transfers of money. He also offered to procure night goggles for use by the group.

– The appellant travelled to Pakistan alone and with Khyam, and attended Babar’s small arms training camp. He made his parents’ home in Pakistan available to the "bros". He suggested members of the U.K. group travel to Canada for weapons training. He also proposed to Khyam via email that a supporter of the Khyam group be sent to Israel on a suicide mission.

– On March 29, 2004, the RCMP arrested the appellant and searched his house in Orleans, Ottawa. They seized the "Hi-Fi Digimonster", electronic components and devices, parts suitable for constructing more remote arming devices, documents corroborating the assembly process for the device, instructional literature and tools, military calibre rifles and ammunition, other weapons, hard drives, $10,300 in one-hundred dollar bills, military books and jihad-related books. No blasting caps, other detonators or explosives components were discovered.

The appeal was won by the Crown and the court increased Khawaja sentence to life in prison. He is unlikely to get parole as long as he is housed in a supermax prison.

Khawaja was held at the Special Handling Unit at Archambault Institution in Sainte-Anne-des-Plaines, Quebec. He has been there since 2009 and has been kept in segregation. He since then has moved to Bath Institution where he is chairman of the lifers group
