= Afifi al-Akiti =

21st-century Islamic studies scholar

Yang Berbahagia Dato' Afifi al-Akiti DPCM DPMS PMP
- محمد عفيفي العقيتي
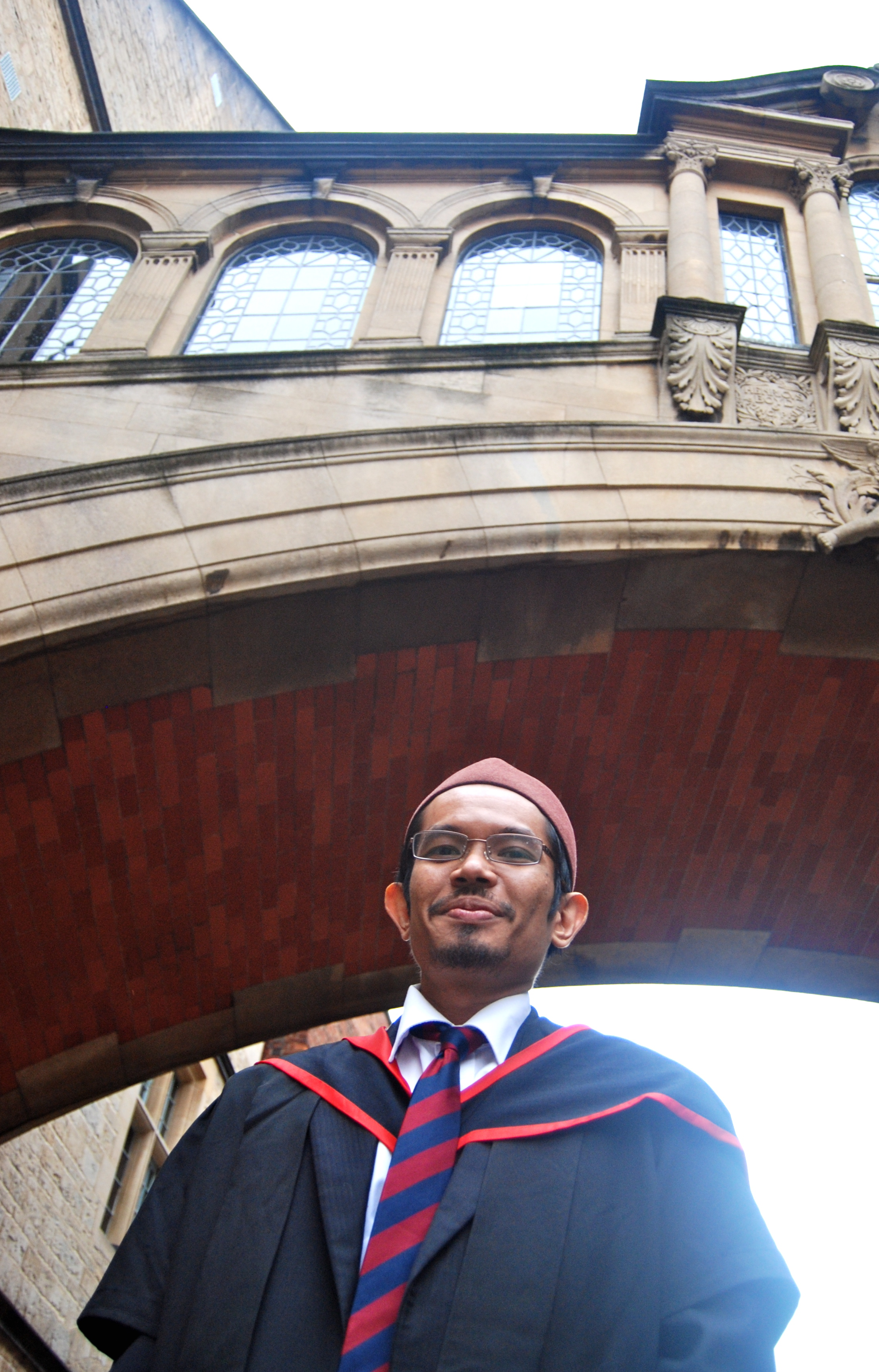
- Al-Akiti at Oxford

Personal life
- Born: 17 June 1976 (age 50)
- Era: Modern
- Main interest: Theology
- Notable work: Defending the Transgressed by Censuring the Reckless against the Killing of Civilians et al.
- Education: Queen's University Belfast (BA); Worcester College, Oxford (MSt, DPhil)

Religious life
- Religion: Islam
- Jurisprudence: Shafi'i
- Creed: Ashari Sunni

Muslim leader
- Awards: Clarendon Scholarship

Muhammad Afifi al-Akiti (born 1976), also known as Shaykh Afifi, is the KFAS Fellow in Islamic Studies at the Oxford Centre for Islamic Studies. He is also the Islamic Centre Lecturer in Islamic Studies at the Faculty of Theology, University of Oxford, and is a Fellow of Worcester College, Oxford. He is the first Malay to be appointed to such a position in this university. Elsewhere, he is a visiting professor of Universiti Teknologi MARA in Malaysia. He has also received widespread media recognition across the globe.

In 2010, Afifi al-Akiti was appointed Privy Councillor to the State of Perak, Malaysia, by the Crown Prince of Perak, Raja Dr Nazrin Shah.

Afifi al-Akiti is listed in The 500 Most Influential Muslims since 2010. In 2009, along with Professor Muhammad Abdel Haleem and the IIIT, Afifi al-Akiti was shortlisted for the Annual UK Muslim Awards, in one of its 15 coveted Awards for Excellence, the Allama Iqbal Award for Creativity in Islamic Thought. In 2011, Afifi al-Akiti was awarded the Darjah Paduka Mahkota Perak (PMP), the Malaysian equivalent to the British CBE. In 2012, he was the sole recipient of the Darjah Dato' Paduka Cura Si-Manja Kini (DPCM) in that year's Sultan of Perak Birthday Honours List, which carries the Malaysian title of Dato'.

== Education ==
Afifi al-Akiti, who comes from Malaysia, is trained as a theologian and philologist in both the Islamic and Western traditions: educated originally at the feet of the ulema of the Muslim world, he subsequently received a First Class degree in Scholastic philosophy and the History of science from the Queen's University Belfast, where he was awarded various scholarships to read for his Masters and Doctoral degrees at Oxford University. His areas of expertise are Islamic theology, philosophy and science.

Afifi al-Akiti completed his DPhil in Medieval Arabic Philosophy from Oxford University as a Clarendon Scholar in 2008. His thesis is a study of the Madnun corpus attributed to Islamic theologian al-Ghazali (d. 505/1111). His findings are based on a survey of nearly 50 medieval Arabic manuscripts. Besides acquainting scholars with this body of source material, his three-volume study presents a critical edition of this corpus, t a manual on metaphysics and natural philosophy called the Major Madnun.

== Defending the Transgressed ==
On 23 July 2005, just days after the London bombings, Afifi al-Akiti wrote Defending the Transgressed by Censuring the Reckless against the Killing of Civilians (Arabic: Mudafi' al-Mazlum bi-Radd al-Muhamil 'ala Qital Man La Yuqatil), the foreword of which was described by Gibril Haddad as a "fatwa" or a "response by a qualified Muslim scholar against the killing of civilians". Furthermore:

Upon reading Shaykh Afifi's fatwa do not be surprised to find that you have probably never before seen such clarity of thought and expression together with breadth of knowledge of Islamic Law applied (by a non-native speaker) to define key Islamic concepts pertaining to the conduct of war and its jurisprudence, its arena and boundaries, suicide bombing, the reckless targeting of civilians, and more.

This work was freely available on the Internet. It was written in response to a statement issued by the radical group al-Muhajiroun, which refers to the 9/11 hijackers as the "Magnificent 19", and claims that while Muslims who live in the West are not allowed to wage war against the government, Muslims who live elsewhere do not face the same prohibition. The leader of al-Muhajiroun, Omar Bakri Muhammad, argues that the British government broke a "covenant of security" with its Muslim citizens by introducing anti-terror legislation and indefinite detention of terror suspects. British Muslims therefore had a right to consider themselves at war with the government, he claims. Countering this argument, Afifi al-Akiti says that Omar Bakri has no authority to issue such a war directive as only a Muslim government could issue one. If a Muslim were to carry out such an attack, he would be a murderer and not a martyr or hero.

Defending the Transgressed was subsequently published as a book by Aqsa Press (Birmingham) and Warda Publications (Hellenthal, Germany) in September 2005. A year later the Defending the Transgressed appeared (as second edition) in The State We Are In – a collection containing contributions on the same topic by other notable Muslim scholars, including the likes of Hamza Yusuf and Abdallah Bin Bayyah. Its third edition is published in 2009 as part of the Oxford Amnesty Lectures (OAL) 2006 series, War Against Terror.

So far, Defending the Transgressed has been translated into a number of languages including German, Spanish, Albanian and Swedish.

== Honours ==
- Perak
  - Commander of the Order of the Perak State Crown (PMP) (2011)
  - Knight of the Order of Cura Si Manja Kini (DPCM) – Dato’ (2012)
- Selangor
  - Knight Commander of the Order of the Crown of Selangor (DPMS) – Dato’ (2015)

== Video links ==
- Anak Melayu Pertama Menjadi Pensyarah di Universiti Oxford
- Dr. Afifi al-Akiti @ Sudut Pandang Astro Awani
- The Hidden Treasure of Imam al-Ghazali
- Scholars and activists offer some wise words to the YMAG
- Buletin Utama TV3 – Bersama Dr. Afifi Al-Akiti
- New Statesman – Suicide Bombers

== Press links ==
- Scholar Urges Ulama To Be Equipped With Other Knowledge
- Ulama Perlu Lengkapi Diri Dengan Pengetahun Lain, Kata Cendekiawan Oxford
- Penseur malaisien: Oulémas musulmans doivent apprendre les nouvelles sciences
- Muslim perlu hidupkan semula semangat penyelidikan (Berita Harian)
- Watch This Face: Dr Afifi al-Akiti (Emel, issue no. 62, Nov 2009)
- New Statesman – Suicide attacks are un-Islamic
- Syed Jaafar, Muhammad Afifi dilantik ahli majlis MAAIAMP (Utusan Malaysia)
- King, Wan Azizah join top Muslim influence list (Malaysian Insider)
- Muslim berpengaruh: Senarai Malaysia naik, Nik Aziz bukan lagi 50 teratas (Utusan Malaysia, 14 November 2010)
- Understand each other to prevent conflict (Brunei Times)
