= Prevention of Terrorism Acts =

Prevention of Terrorism (Temporary Provisions) Act 1974 (Note: Section 13(1).)
- Act of Parliament
- Parliament of the United Kingdom
- Long title: An Act to proscribe organisations concerned in terrorism, and to give power to exclude certain persons from Great Britain or the United Kingdom in order to prevent acts of terrorism, and for connected purposes.
- Citation: 1974 c. 56
- Territorial extent: United Kingdom (Note: Section 13(2). Part I does not extend to Northern Ireland.)

Dates
- Royal assent: 29 November 1974
- Commencement: 29 November 1974 (Note: The Acts of Parliament (Commencement) Act 1793.)
- Repealed: 25 March 1976
Other legislation
Repealed by	Prevention of Terrorism (Temporary Provisions) Act 1976
Relates to	Prevention of Violence (Temporary Provisions) Act 1939

Status: Repealed

Text of statute as originally enacted

Prevention of Terrorism (Temporary Provisions) Act 1984 (Note: Section 19(1).)
- Act of Parliament
- Parliament of the United Kingdom
- Long title: An Act to repeal and re-enact with amendments the provisions of the Prevention of Terrorism (Temporary Provisions) Act 1976.
- Citation: 1984 c. 8
- Territorial extent: United Kingdom (Note: Section 19(2). Part I does not extend to Northern Ireland.)

Dates
- Royal assent: 22 March 1984
- Commencement: 22 March 1984 (Note: Section 4(b) of the Interpretation Act 1978.)
- Repealed: 22 March 1989
Other legislation
Repeals/revokes	Prevention of Terrorism (Temporary Provisions) Act 1976
Repealed by	Prevention of Terrorism (Temporary Provisions) Act 1989

Status: Repealed

Text of statute as originally enacted

The Prevention of Terrorism Acts were a series of acts of the Parliament of the United Kingdom from 1974 to 1989 that conferred emergency powers upon police forces where they suspected terrorism.

The direct ancestor of the bill was the Prevention of Violence (Temporary Provisions) Act 1939 which was brought into law in response to an Irish Republican Army (IRA) campaign of violence under the S-Plan. The Prevention of Violence Act was allowed to expire in 1953 and was repealed in 1973 to be reintroduced under the Prevention of Terrorism (Temporary Provisions) Act 1974.

In 2000, the acts were replaced with the more permanent Terrorism Act 2000, which contained many of their powers, and then the Prevention of Terrorism Act 2005. See also Terrorism (Northern Ireland) Act 2006.

== Powers contained in the acts ==
Section 8 of the Prevention of Terrorism (Temporary Provisions) Act 1974 provided for temporary powers to examine of persons travelling between Northern Ireland and Great Britain, both within the UK and the Common Travel Area. Schedule 7 of the Terrorism Act 2000 provides for similar powers that remains in force.

== Censorship ==
In 1980, the BBC's Panorama filmed the IRA on patrol in Carrickmore. The footage was seized by police under the Prevention of Terrorism Acts following an outcry in parliament and the press. They were also used to convict Channel 4 and an independent production company over a Dispatches report in 1991 under new powers in the 1989 revision.

== History of the acts ==
The first act was enacted in 1974 following the IRA bombing campaigns of the early 1970s. The Act was introduced by Roy Jenkins, then Home Secretary, as a severe and emergency reaction to the Birmingham pub bombings on 21 November 1974. 21 people died and 184 were injured. There was a strong desire to respond to what was perceived as "the greatest threat [to the country] since the end of the Second World War". The conception of the Bill was announced on 25 November, when the Home Secretary warned that: "The powers ... are Draconian. In combination they are unprecedented in peacetime." Parliament was supportive and had passed the Bill by 29 November, virtually without amendment or dissent. The Bill passed through the Commons on 28 and 29 November and passed through Lords on 29 November. In fact, much of the Bill had been drafted in secrecy during the previous year, as shown in the only full-length television commentary on the legislation by Clive Walker.

The Philips commission on Criminal Procedure, published 1981, had a significant impact on the subsequent 1984 legislation.

It was rewritten in 1976, 1984 and again in 1989, but continued to stay as emergency 'temporary' powers, that had to be renewed each year. The first three Acts all contained final date clauses beyond the annual renewal; this provision was not included in the 1989 Act.

== See also ==
- Prevention of Terrorism (Temporary Provisions) Act 1989
- Terrorism Acts since 2000
- Diplock courts
- Royal Commission on Criminal Procedure, 1981
- Censorship in the United Kingdom
- 1988–1994 British broadcasting voice restrictions
