= Lawrence Greenspon =

Canadian lawyer

Lawrence Greenspon is an Ottawa-based lawyer who was the defence counsel in the Momin Khawaja terrorist trial.

== Biography ==
Greenspon was born and raised in Montreal and moved to Ottawa in 1974; he became a civil libertarian before commencing his legal work.

Greenspon is an associate in the Ottawa firm Greenspon Granger Hill, practising both criminal defence and civil litigation. He has been involved in the defence of a number of high-profile cases. In August 2017, Senator Mike Duffy announced that he would sue the Senate of Canada and the RCMP for $8 million in lost income and general damages because of his suspension, for which he was acquitted, and hired Greenspon to represent him. The lawsuit was dismissed in 2018 due to parliamentary privilege. Duffy appealed, and the decision was upheld by the Ontario Court of Appeal in 2020. The decision was appealed again to the Supreme Court of Canada, who dismissed the appeal in 2021.

He is a past chair of the Ottawa Jewish Community Centre and the United Way Community Services Cabinet and has received several honours, including a Lifetime Achievement from Volunteer Ottawa and the Community Builder of the Year Award by the United Way.

He married Angela Lariviere in July 2015.

On January 3, 2018, the lawyer representing Joshua Boyle said that the defendant planned to have Greenspon and partner Eric Granger take over the defence against 15 criminal charges. Boyle is a high-profile defendant because he and his family had been released after five years of captivity in Afghanistan only months before his arrest for offences alleged to have been committed in Ottawa. The charges were dismissed in 2019.

In 2022, Greenspon represented the family of a 14-year old boy who climbed through City of Ottawa-erected fencing at the disused Prince of Wales Bridge and drowned after jumping into the Ottawa River. The family filed a $1.5 million lawsuit against the City alleging that it was negligent for not taking effective steps to stop such incidents at the bridge.
