= Sajeel Abu Ibrahim =

British computer scientist

- Occupation: Computer scientist
- Known for: Helping to lead a proscribed Islamist group based in the United Kingdom

Sajeel Abu Ibrahim Shahid is a man who was one of the leaders of Al-Muhajiroun, an Islamist group based in the United Kingdom that endorsed al Qaeda's terror attacks on 11 September 2001. He was called the Emir or Lahore Emir and was the head of Al-Muhajiroun in Pakistan. On 1 December 2001, an interview with Ibrahim was published in the Manchester Evening News, in which he described fellow young men from the Manchester area travelling to Pakistan to fight beside the Taliban.

The Pakistani government abducted and held Ibrahim in 2005 at an undisclosed location without access to the justice system for three-month before expelling him. PTI chief Imran Khan called Ibrahim's abduction and detention a gross human rights violation.

Ibrahim has a degree in computer science from Manchester University.
