= Hi-Fi Digimonster =

The Hi-Fi Digimonster is an electronic device that can detonate a bomb. It was built for terrorists and designed for use in a terrorist plot in the United Kingdom. A device seized by the police in Canada from the home of Momin Khawaja had a range of 100 metres (328 ft) in a neighbourhood, but in an open area the range could be 300 metres (984 ft).
