= Sayyed Ahmed Abdel-Maqssuod =

Accused of membership in al-Jihad

Sayyed Ahmed Abdel-Maqssuod (سيد أحمد عبدالمقصود) was arrested in September 1998 in the United Kingdom and accused of membership in Egyptian Islamic Jihad.

He was arrested as part of Operation Challenge, which arrested seven men living in Britain through use of the Prevention of Terrorism (Temporary Provisions) Act 1989, accusing them of links to al-Jihad. One of the men was charged with possession of a weapon. Six months after the arrests, British Muslims staged a demonstration in front of 10 Downing Street to protest the continued incarceration of the seven men.
