= Sayyed Ajami =

Accused of membership in al-Jihad

Sayyed Ajami (سيد عجمي) was arrested in September 1998 in the United Kingdom, and accused of membership in al-Jihad.

He was arrested as part of Operation Challenge, which arrested seven men living in Britain through use of the Prevention of Terrorism (Temporary Provisions) Act 1989, accusing them of links to al-Jihad. One of the men was charged with possession of a weapon. Six months after the arrests, British Muslims staged a demonstration in front of 10 Downing Street to protest the continued incarceration of the seven men.

He had previously been arrested multiple times throughout the 1980s.
