= Operation Crevice =

2004 British anti-terrorism police raid

Operation Crevice was a raid launched by Metropolitan and local police in England on the morning of 30 March 2004. It was in response to a report indicating cells of terrorists of Pakistani origin operating in the Thames Valley, Sussex, Surrey and Bedfordshire areas, the source of which was said to be an interception of an instruction sent from Al-Qaeda leaders in Pakistan to militants in Britain. In March 2020 Jonathan Evans, Former Director General, MI5 gave an interview and citing one passage: 'The plot itself, however, appeared to be encouraged and fomented by al-Qa`ida in the tribal areas. It was one of the early ones we saw. It involved predominantly British citizens or British residents of Pakistani heritage, something which became something of a theme for this period'. The operation resulted in five men being found guilty in April 2007 of conspiring to cause explosions likely to endanger life.

== The arrests ==
A number of arrests were made, and 1,300 pounds (600 kg) of ammonium nitrate fertilizer, which can be used to make bombs, were confiscated. The chemical was seized in a storage space in Hanwell in west London. One of the staff reported her suspicions as to the activity to the police and subject of a police audio clip (other issues are covered).

At least six homes in Langley Green, Crawley, were searched, and an area was excavated at one site. A biscuit tin filled with aluminium powder, another potential bomb ingredient, was recovered behind a garden shed.

The arrest of software engineer Momin Khawaja on 29 March 2004, in Ottawa, Canada, was reportedly related to Operation Crevice. He was reportedly experimenting with remote-controlled detonators.

The court case against the men began in March 2006 and lasted till April 30, 2007. The jury was out for 27 days. The accused were named as:

- Salahuddin Amin, 31, from Luton, Bedfordshire
- Jawad Akbar, 22, from Crawley, West Sussex
- Anthony Garcia (also known as Rahman Benouis), 23, of Ilford, east London
- Nabeel Hussain, 20, of Horley, Surrey (subsequently found not guilty)
- Omar Khyam, 24-year-old computer student from Crawley, West Sussex, who was captain of the Sussex Under-18 Cricket team and had been expected to play for the England national team.
- Waheed Mahmood, 34, from Crawley, West Sussex
- Shujah Mahmood, 19, from Crawley, West Sussex (subsequently found not guilty)

Mohammad Momin Khawaja, serving a life sentence in Canada, was the eighth man charged with being involved in the plot. A ninth man, Mohammed Junaid Babar, was the prosecution's star witness. An alleged leader of this group was a man named Mohammed Quayyum Khan who was an alleged associate of both Abu Hamza and Omar Bakri. Mohammed Quayyum Khan (or "Q" as he was called by the group and the courts) was apparently still at large after the police, inexplicably, failed to arrest him.

The court case was based mainly on the evidence of so-called supergrass (informant) Mohammed Junaid Babar, who was found guilty of terrorist offences in the United States. The counsel for the defence called this witness "a liar, nothing more than a conceited fantasist."

== The trial ==
The BBC reported that potential targets included the Bluewater shopping centre in Greenhithe, Kent, the Ministry of Sound nightclub in London and London synagogues.

== Mohammed Junaid Babar ==
Mohammed Junaid Babar was the prosecution's star witness. He was flown to London to give evidence in the case, and arrived at court amid heavy security, driven from a police station in an armoured convoy with a helicopter overhead.

The prosecution claimed that he was part of the plot and had "an insight as an insider into the events and plans, which an outsider could not have."

He was given immunity from prosecution in relation to the charges the British defendants face.

He claims to have stolen three computers from a software company he worked for in Peshawar and given them to Mahmood because they were needed by Al Qaeda. The company was run by the older brother of one of the founder members of al-Muhajiroun.

The trial began in March 2006, and the prosecution ran its charges until the end of August. The allegations brought up by the witness testimony and evidence included the following:

- Possession of a 600 kg bag of ammonium nitrate fertiliser "which could have been used to make bombs".
- Planning to hide ammonium nitrate in bags of dried fruit so that it could be shipped to the UK by Federal Express.
- Conspiring with Mohammed Momin Khawaja, a Canadian, and other unknown persons to "cause... an explosion... of a nature likely to endanger life".
- Working for Abdul Hadi, said to be number three in Al Qaeda.
- Planning to transport detonators inside small radios or bottles of shampoo or shaving cream from Pakistan to the UK via Iran, Turkey, eastern Europe, and Belgium.
- Planning to buy a radio-isotope bomb from the Russian mafia in Belgium.
- Plotting to poison football crowds by selling spiked drinks at matches, and sell poisoned food from a takeaway restaurant.
- Receiving terrorist training in the use of explosives in Pakistan.
- Planning to set off explosions in shopping centres, nightclubs, synagogues, and disrupt electricity and gas supplies. The police played secret recordings during the trial made in February 2004 of the suspects discussing potential targets.
- Plotting to emulate the 11 September 2001 attacks by finding 30 "brothers" willing to commit suicide and crash a plane. (This discussion was also caught on tape.)

Omar Khyam's defence testimony began with him telling the court of his gradual conversion to militant jihadist and wish to help the fighters in Kashmir and Afghanistan.

Then, on 18 September, to the surprise of his defence counsel, Khyam refused to give any more evidence, stating that the ISI in Pakistan has had words with his family and were worried that he might reveal more about them. He added: "right now, as much as I want to clarify matters, the priority for me has to be the safety of my family so I am going to stop." He assured the judge that he understood that his refusal to answer questions might cause the jury to be suspicious.

Salahuddin Amin's testimony consisted of claims that he had been tortured by his Pakistani jailers during his 10-month detention, and that this must have been known to the US and British officials who interviewed him numerous times during his detention. He said he confessed to being involved in a plot to buy an "isotope bomb" after being hung up by his wrists and beaten on his back and "things" with the lashes, and threatened to be raped by the handle.

Nabeel Hussain, who loaned the money to pay for the storage of ammonium nitrate, claimed he thought it was sand.

Counsel for Shujah Mahmood, who was only 16 at the time of the events, claimed he was not aware of the plot and was merely taken advantage of by his older brother.

Judge Sir Michael Astill announced on 20 April 2007 that he would accept a majority verdict in the case. On 30 April, Omar Khyam, Waheed Mahmood, Jawad Akbar, Salahuddin Amin, and Anthony Garcia were found guilty of conspiring to cause explosions likely to endanger life between 1 January 2003 and 31 March 2004. Shujah Mahmood and Nabeel Hussain were found not guilty of all charges.

The defendants found guilty were sentenced to life imprisonment. Omar Khyam was given a minimum term of 20 years, Anthony Garcia 20 years, Jawad Akbar 17½ years, Waheed Mahmood 20 years and Salahuddin Amin 17½ years.

Momin Khawaja was found guilty in Canada’s first terrorism trial on charges of helping to develop bomb detonators, possession of explosives, helping to finance terrorist activity, receiving terrorist training and facilitating terrorism. On March 12, 2009 he was sentenced to 10.5 years in prison which was later increased to Life-24.

== Background ==
An organisation associated with the attacks is the group al-Muhajiroun. According to the BBC, some of the perpetrators became interested in jihad during the time they were involved with al-Muhajiroun. According to Professor Anthony Glees, director of the Brunel Centre for Intelligence and Security Studies –

The fertiliser bomb trial has given us the smoking-gun evidence that groups like al-Muhajiroun have had an important part in radicalising young British Muslims, and that this can create terrorists.

Al-Muhajiroun was disbanded by its founder Omar Bakri Mohammed in 2004. Shortly after 7 July 2005 London bombings, Prime Minister Tony Blair "announced the group would be banned as part of a series of measures against condoning or glorifying terrorism."
