= Mohammed Junaid Babar =

Pakistani American

Mohammed Junaid Babar is a Pakistani American who, after pleading guilty to terrorist related offences in New York, testified in March 2006 against a group of men accused of plotting 21 July 2005 London bombings. In return for being a government supergrass, his sentence was drastically reduced to time served and he was released leading to widespread criticism in Britain.

== Early life ==
Babar was born in Pakistan. In 1977 Mohammed Babar moved to the United States with his family when he was two years old and grew up in Queens, New York. He attended a Military Academy, an all boy military boarding school on Long Island. He studied pharmacy at St. John's University in New York City but dropped out. He adopted radical views of Sunni Islam during the Gulf War when he was employed in a number of unskilled jobs including valet parking. He joined various groups including the al-Muhajiroun

Mohammed Babar's mother worked in the World Trade Center on the 9th floor and survived the terrorist attacks on September 11th. He supplied materials such as night vision goggles, sleeping bags, waterproof socks and ponchos and money to high-ranking al-Qaeda officials in South Waziristan. In the summer of 2003 he helped to set up a terrorist training camp where Mohammad Sidique Khan, the leader of the 2005 London suicide bombers, and several other British terrorists learned how to manufacture explosives.

== Detention in America ==
He was arrested in New York City in April 2004 after his return from Pakistan, and on June 2, 2004, pleaded guilty to five counts of providing, and conspiring to provide, money and supplies to Al Qaeda terrorists fighting in Afghanistan against U.S., international forces, or the Northern Alliance. Facing up to 70 years in prison in U.S. he agreed to cooperate with authorities.

=== Operation Crevice ===
Babar was the star witness in the case against seven terrorist suspects arrested in Britain in March 2004 as part of Operation Crevice. He has been flown to London to give evidence in the case, and arrived at court amid heavy security, driven from a police station in an armoured convoy with a helicopter overhead. He had been given immunity from prosecution in relation to the charges the British defendants faced.

During his testimony he claimed to have been part of two separate attempts to kill General Pervez Musharraf in 2002 and admitted that he would be facing the death penalty in Pakistan if he was not working for the FBI. He also said that he had associated with Abu Hamza al-Masri and Omar Bakri Mohammed.

The prosecution claimed that Babar was part of the plot and had "an insight as an insider into the events and plans, which an outsider could not have." The counsel for the defence called Babar "a liar, nothing more than a conceited fantasist."

He also told a British court during 17 days of testimony in 2007 that he ran training camps in Pakistan for Islamic militants and nurtured a generation of homegrown British terrorists. Babar is still working with the British under a deal that he will not be charged as long as he cooperates.

=== Momin Khawaja ===
In 2008 Mohammed Babar testified in a trial against the accused Momin Khawaja, in Ottawa, Canada. Khawaja was accused of being involved with several terrorist plots, including the London nightclub incident. In light of Babar's attendance, security at the national capital courthouse was extremely tight, with bomb sniffing dogs, and metal detectors outside the building's premises.

=== Release ===
He initially faced up to 70 years in prison. However, after spending four years and eight months in prison, over a year of which in a high security section of MCC New York, he was released on bail in 2008. On 10 December 2010 his sentence was set to "time served". The reason given for his release was that he had agreed to cooperate fully with any investigation or prosecution by the U.S. Attorney's Office. According to the judge who set his sentence "Mr. Babar began cooperating even before his arrest." His early release raised suspicions among lawyers that Babar may have been an informant for the US government before his arrest in April 2004. This decision was widely criticized in Britain. In return for being a government supergrass his sentence was drastically reduced to time served and he was released.
