= Omar Khyam =

British terrorist (born 1982)

- Born: 1982 (age 43–44)
- Arrested: Britain Security Official
- Citizenship: United Kingdom
- Alleged to be a member of: al-Muhajiroun

Omar Khyam is a British man who led a terrorist plot to explode a fertilizer bomb in London in 2004 for which he received a life sentence with a minimum term of 20 years. He was trained in bomb-making at the Malakand training camp in Pakistan in 2001 or 2002. He was moved to HM Prison Full Sutton, near York, in March 2008.
