= Dilpazier Aslam =

British journalist

Dilpazier Aslam (born 1978) is a former trainee journalist with The Guardian. He came to public attention in July 2005 when he lost his position with the newspaper after being named as a member of the Islamist group Hizb ut-Tahrir. The Guardian was alerted to Aslam's membership in the group by bloggers who read Aslam's 'Comment' op-ed article on the 7 July London bombings. Entitled "We Rock the Boat," the 13 July article discussed the attitudes of young British Muslims and how their increasing anger over perceived injustices contrasted with their elders' silence.

Before joining The Guardian, Aslam had written three articles for Khilafah.com, a website closely associated with Hizb ut-Tahrir, and was once called its Middle Eastern correspondent. The newspaper stated that after publication of "We Rock the Boat," it found an article on Khalifah.com, that appeared to be an "incitement of violence against Jews." Aslam told Alan Rusbridger, The Guardian's editor, that he personally rejected antisemitism, would not leave Hizb ut-Tahrir, and did not consider Khilafah.com antisemitic. Rusbridger and other executives decided that membership in Hizb ut-Tahrir was not compatible with membership in the trainee scheme.

== Early career ==
Aslam studied journalism at Sheffield University with the help of a bursary from the Sheffield Star. Previously he had been a journalistic trainee at the Matlock Mercury in 2004, and won the National Union of Journalists George Viner award for promising black journalists in 2003.

== Controversy ==
Aslam wrote or co-wrote a number of news articles on the London bombings. Then, in a 13 July 2005 opinion piece entitled "We Rock the Boat", he wrote to condemn the bombings but also to tell readers that "If, as police announced yesterday, four men (at least three from Yorkshire) blew themselves up in the name of Islam, then please let us do ourselves a favour and not act shocked," as "the attack was inevitable" and the result of civilian Iraqi casualties following the US invasion of that country. He went on to suggest that there was a gulf between younger and older generations of British Muslims, and that the younger generation was no longer prepared to suffer perceived injustices in silence. Specifically, he described recent personal experiences at Leeds and Sheffield mosques, in which community religious leaders failed to mention the November 2004 US-Iraqi-British assault on Fallujah, Iraq, which many British Muslims were angry about. The article begins as follows:

If I'm asked about 7/7, I – a Yorkshire lad, born and bred – will respond first by giving an out-clause to being labelled a terrorist lover. I think what happened in London was a sad day and not the way to express your political anger. Then there's the "but." If, as police announced yesterday, four men (at least three from Yorkshire) blew themselves up in the name of Islam, then please let us do ourselves a favour and not act shocked.

Scott Burgess, a conservative American blogger living in London, searched for Aslam's name on the Internet and discovered that he was a member of Hizb ut-Tahrir, had written articles for its website, Khilafah.com, and quoted the BBC as saying the HT website "promotes racism and anti-Semitic hatred, calls suicide bombers martyrs, and urges Muslims to kill Jewish people." A blogging campaign soon began, supported by notable left- and right-wing blogs, and taken up by some of the mainstream press, to get Aslam sacked. At first, The Guardian appeared to stand by its employee, but he was finally given his notice for refusing to end his membership in Hizb ut-Tahrir. The Guardian said it had been unaware of his membership of the party, and that "on his 15-page application form he did not mention that he was a member of the Islamist political party, Hizb ut-Tahrir, despite being invited to describe any participation in public affairs or political campaigning." However it also noted that after joining the Guardian, Aslam "made no secret of his membership of this political party, drawing it to the attention of several colleagues and some senior editors." It was also said he submitted his work for Hizb ut-Tahrir's website as part of his application. On announcing that Aslam had been dismissed, The Guardian published a story describing how the blog campaign had unfolded, calling it a "demonstration of the way the 'blogosphere' can be used to mount obsessively personalised attacks at high speed." The publication wrote that Scott Burgess had made a failed application for the Guardian traineeship that had gone to Aslam. Burgess countered that he had only facetiously posted the application on his weblog to entertain his readers.

Aslam sued over his premature dismissal from the paper. The Guardian released a statement on 26 May 2006 that it and Alsam "had reached an agreement for the final settlement of an Employment Tribunal claim following the early termination of Mr Aslam's contract as a trainee reporter with the Guardian in July 2005."
