= The Saved Sect =

2005–2006 British Islamist organisation

The Saved Sect (Arabic: الفرقة الناجية, al-Firqat un-Naajiyah), formerly and more generally known as The Saviour Sect, is an Islamist organization that operated in the United Kingdom from its formation in November 2005 until the British government proscribed it on 17 July 2006. It is widely believed, along with Al Ghurabaa, to be the reformed Al-Muhajiroun, which Omar Bakri Muhammad disbanded in 2004. It is believed that Omar Bakri today still heads this organisation.

== Overview ==
The Saved Sect believe the majority of Muslims living in the Western world are forgetting their roots, and sees their primary purpose as being to remind the Ummah of what they regard as true Islamic values.

The name of the group is derived from a hadith (or tradition) ascribed to the Islamic prophet, Muhammad, "My ummah will split into seventy-three sects, all of whom will be in Hell except one group." They said: Who are they, O Messenger of Allaah? He said: "(Those who follow) that which I and my companions follow." This is mentioned in the hadeeth of 'Abd-Allaah ibn 'Amr which was recorded and classed as hasan by al-Tirmidhi (2641). It was also classed as hasan by al-'Iraaqi in Ahkaam al-Qur'an (3/432), al-'Iraaqi in Takhreej al-Ihya' (3/284) and al-Albaani in Saheeh al-Tirmidhi.

On 17 July 2006 the group was banned under new legislation in Britain. Home Secretary John Reid laid an order in Parliament which made it a criminal offence for a person to belong to or encourage support for the group, to arrange meetings in its support, or to wear clothes or carry articles in public indicating support or membership.

Although the organisation's website claims to represent the views of the Saviour Sect in Islam, they do not claim that they themselves are the Saviour Sect, as this apparently would be ascribing purity to themselves and would also indicate that they have knowledge of al-Ghayb (the unseen), which Muslims believe only Allah knows about.

They claim to be followers of Ahl us-Sunnah wal-Jamaa'ah (People of the Sunnah and the Community) and that their teachings are of as-Salaf us-Saalih (the Pious Predecessors). However, many Sunnis firmly refute this.

In November 2005, Al Ghurabaa and the Saved Sect were re-established under the name Ahlus Sunnah wal Jamaah. This organisation operates mainly through an invitation-only Internet forum, of which Anjem Choudary is a prominent contributor, using the username "Abou Adha". A reporter visiting the site found recordings of Osama bin Laden, Ayman al-Zawahiri, and Omar Bakri Mohammed, as well as calls for holy war.

== See also ==
- UK Islamist demonstration outside Danish Embassy
- Islam4UK
- Al Ghurabaa
- Al Muhajiroun
- Islamism
