= Al Ghurabaa =

2004–2006 Muslim organisation in the UK

Al Ghurabaa (Arabic: الغرباء; English: The Strangers) is an Islamist organization based in United Kingdom which, along with The Saviour Sect, Islam4UK and others, is widely believed to be the reformed Al-Muhajiroun after it disbanded in 2004 by order of Omar Bakri Muhammad. Other members include Abu Izzadeen and Abu Uzair.

On 12 August 2005 Omar Bakri Muhammad was banned from Britain and excluded by Charles Clarke from returning from Lebanon. On 17 July 2006 the group was proscribed under legislation in Britain outlawing organizations that support terrorism. Home Secretary John Reid laid an order in Parliament which makes it a criminal offence for a person to belong to or encourage support for the group, to arrange meetings in its support, or to wear clothes or carry articles in public indicating support or membership.

The name of the group is derived from a hadith (or tradition) ascribed to Muhammad, "Islam began as something strange and will end as something strange...so give glad tidings to the strangers."

Anjem Choudary, previously a leader of Al-Muhajiroun, was a spokesman or prominent figure in al Ghurabaa'. In 2010 he reemerged as the leader of Islam4UK.

== Meetings ==
Al Ghurabaa was banned by Waltham Forest Council from holding meetings at premises within walking distance of the homes of several of the 2006 transatlantic aircraft plot suspects.

Abu Izzadeen, a Muslim convert also known as Omar Brookes, was ejected from an open community meeting in East London at which the Home Secretary John Reid was speaking. Izzadeen was furious about "state terrorism by British police" and heckled Reid before being ejected by the police.

== Death threats ==
In response to the Jyllands-Posten Muhammad cartoons controversy, Al Ghurabaa' published an article on their website titled, "Kill those who insult the Prophet Muhammad". The article states, "The insulting of the Messenger Muhammad is something that the Muslims cannot and will not tolerate and the punishment in Islam for the one who does so is death. This is the sunnah of the prophet and the verdict of Islam upon such people, one that any Muslim is able [to] execute."

Al Ghurabaa' had organized the 3 February protest march from London Central Mosque to the Danish Embassy, where protesters waved placards reading, "Butcher those who mock Islam", "Kill those who insult Islam", "Europe you will pay, your 9/11 is on the way", or "7/7 is on its way", "Europe you will pay, bin Laden is on his way" and "Europe you'll come crawling, when the Mujahideen come roaring".

Despite the similar theme on Al Ghurabaa's website, their spokesman, Anjem Choudary, said he did not know who wrote the placards. MPs from all parties condemned the protest, calling the Metropolitan police to pursue those responsible on the grounds that the threats were an incitement to murder.

== New organization ==
In November 2005, The Saved Sect was re-established under the name Ahlus Sunnah wal Jamaah. This organization operates mainly through an invitation-only internet forum, of which Anjem Choudary is a prominent contributor, using the username "Abou Luqman". A reporter visiting the site found recordings of Osama bin Laden, Ayman al-Zawahiri, and Omar Bakri Mohammed, as well as calls for holy war and form a new coalition united behind al-Qaida.

== See also ==
- Islam in the United Kingdom

== Related media articles ==
- A Critical Study of the Multiple Identities and Disguises of 'al-Muhajiroun'
- Treason threat cleric 'leaves UK'
- Why radical views 'must be heard'
- Terror treason charge considered
- Radicals warned of treason risk
- Profile: Omar Bakri Muhammad
- BBC - 'Police raid Islamic group'
- BBC Newsnight's Richard Watson interviews Al-Muhajiroun recruits
- 10 March 2004, Mahan Abedin of Jamestown.org interviews Omar Bakri Mohammed at his London home
- Telegraph - Al Muhajiroun under scrutiny
- Telegraph - Militants of Al-Muhajiroun seek world Islamic state
- BBC HARDtalk interview, 5 May 2003, Anjem Choudary refuses to condemn suicide attacks.
- Al Ghurabaa - Defend the honour of Muhammad
- Militant groups in the UK The Guardian, June 19, 2002
- Banned Islamists spawn front organisations, Guardian July 22, 2006

=== Video ===
- Anjem Choudary interviewed by Jeremy Paxman Newsnight, BBC
