= Prevention of Terrorism (Temporary Provisions) Act 1989 =

Act of the Parliament of the United Kingdom

Prevention of Terrorism (Temporary Provisions) Act 1989 (Note: Section 28(1).)
- Act of Parliament
- Parliament of the United Kingdom
- Long title: An Act to make provision in place of the Prevention of Terrorism (Temporary Provisions) Act 1984; to make further provision in relation to powers of search under, and persons convicted of scheduled offences within the meaning of, the Northern Ireland (Emergency Provisions) Act 1978; and to enable the Secretary of State to prevent the establishment of new explosives factories, magazines and stores in Northern Ireland.
- Citation: 1989 c. 4
- Territorial extent: United Kingdom (Note: Section 28(2).)

Dates
- Royal assent: 15 March 1989
- Commencement: 22 March 1989 (Note: Section 27.)
- Repealed: 19 February 2001 (Note: The Terrorism Act 2000 (Commencement No. 3) Order 2001.)

Other legislation
- Amends: Extradition Act 1870; Explosives Act 1875; Criminal Justice Act 1967; Northern Ireland (Emergency Provisions) Act 1978; Suppression of Terrorism Act 1978; Criminal Justice (Scotland) Act 1980; Roads (Scotland) Act 1984; Police and Criminal Evidence Act 1984; Drug Trafficking Offences Act 1986
- Repeals/revokes: Prevention of Terrorism (Temporary Provisions) Act 1984; Prevention of Terrorism (Supplemental Temporary Provisions) (Northern Ireland) Order 1984; Prevention of Terrorism (Supplemental Temporary Provisions) Order 1984; Prevention of Terrorism (Supplemental Temporary Provisions) (Amendment) Order 1987; Prevention of Terrorism (Supplemental Temporary Provisions) (Amendment No. 2) Order 1987; Criminal Justice Act 1988
- Amended by: Extradition Act 1989; Northern Ireland (Emergency Provisions) Act 1991; Criminal Justice Act 1993; Channel Tunnel (International Arrangements) Order 1993; Criminal Justice and Public Order Act 1994; Proceeds of Crime Act 1995; Criminal Justice (Scotland) Act 1995; Prevention of Terrorism (Additional Powers) Act 1996; Northern Ireland (Emergency Provisions) Act 1996; Prevention of Terrorism (Exclusion Orders) Regulations 1996; Justices of the Peace Act 1997; Northern Ireland (Emergency Provisions) Act 1998; Criminal Justice (Terrorism and Conspiracy) Act 1998
- Repealed by: Terrorism Act 2000
- Relates to: Immigration Act 1971; Northern Ireland (Emergency Provisions) Act 1978

Status: Repealed

History of passage through Parliament

Text of statute as originally enacted

The Prevention of Terrorism (Temporary Provisions) Act 1989 (c. 4) was an act of the Parliament of the United Kingdom. The act was one of the Prevention of Terrorism Acts related to The Troubles in Northern Ireland.

== Provisions ==
The act had seven parts:

Proscribed Organisations
Allowed for organisations to be made illegal, making membership an arrestable offence. It was also an offence to solicit financial support for any listed group, display signs of public support, or attend a meeting supporting a listed group or addressed by a group member. The maximum penalty was ten years' imprisonment and an unlimited fine. The initial groups outlawed were the Provisional Irish Republican Army (IRA) and the Irish National Liberation Army (INLA) in the United Kingdom and numerous loyalist groups within Northern Ireland.

Exclusion Orders
Exclusion orders could be issued "as expedient" to prevent terrorism relating to Northern Ireland. Orders were issued against individuals to either prevent them entering or being in Great Britain, to exclude them from Northern Ireland, or to exclude them from the United Kingdom. It was an offence to breach an order or to aid another in effecting entry, the maximum sentence was five years' imprisonment and an unlimited fine.

Financial Assistance for Terrorism
As well as the provision under the first part of the Act, contributing, receiving or soliciting financial support for terrorism was an offence under this part also. Additionally, it was an offence to contribute any other resources; to assist in the retention or control of funds for proscribed groups or terrorist acts; or to fail to disclose to the police any suspicions notwithstanding any other restriction. The maximum penalty was fourteen years' imprisonment and an unlimited fine.

Arrest, Detention and Control of Entry
This part allowed for the arrest of individuals without a warrant and on reasonable suspicion that they were guilty of an offence under the Act or otherwise "concerned in the commission, preparation or instigation of acts of terrorism". The period of initial detention was up to 48 hours, this could be extended by a maximum of five additional days by the Home Secretary. The detainee was exempted from certain provisions of other Acts relating to the arrest procedure and the legal protection of those arrested. This part also allowed for streamlined search procedures of persons or property and checks under the Act on persons at port or other border controls.

The remaining parts of the act (Information, Proceedings and Interpretation, Further Provisions for Northern Ireland, and Supplementary) are largely technical, although the Northern Ireland provisions extend the right to search property, restricts remission for those convicted of statutory offences, and tightens control over the granting of licenses under the Explosives Act 1875 (38 & 39 Vict. c. 17) (new explosives factories and magazines).
