= Abu Izzadeen =

British convicted terrorist (born 1975)

- Born: Trevor Richard Brooks; 18 April 1975 (age 51); Hackney, London, UK
- Children: 3
- Convictions: 2008, guilty of incitement to terrorism
- Criminal charges: Breaching the UK's Terrorism Act of 2006.

Abu Izzadeen (Arabic: أبو عز الدين, Abū ‘Izz ad-Dīn; born Trevor Richard Brooks on 18 April 1975) is a British spokesman for Al Ghurabaa, a British Muslim organisation banned under the Terrorism Act 2006 for the glorification of terrorism. He was convicted on charges of terrorist fund-raising and inciting terrorism overseas on 17 April 2008 and sentenced to four and a half years in jail. He was released in May 2009, after serving three and a half years, including time on remand. In January 2016, he was sentenced to two years imprisonment for breaching the Terrorism Act by leaving the UK illegally.

== Personal background ==
Abu Izzadeen is a British citizen born on 18 April 1975 in Hackney, east London, to a Christian family originally from Jamaica. Brooks converted to Islam the day before he turned 18, on 17 April 1993, changing his name to Omar, but preferring to be called Abu Izzadeen. He is fluent in Arabic.

He trained and worked for a while as an electrician. He has three children with his wife, Mokhtaria, whom he married in 1998.

== Political activities ==
Abu Izzadeen met Omar Bakri Muhammed and Abu Hamza al-Masri at Finsbury Park Mosque in the 1990s. He visited Pakistan in 2001, before the 11 September attacks, as part of Al-Muhajiroun; he said he went there to give a series of lectures. He also said he had attended terror training camps in Afghanistan.

He described the 7/7 suicide bombers in London as "completely praiseworthy". On the eve of the anniversary of the 7/7 attacks in London, he was filmed preaching to a group of Muslims in Birmingham mocking and laughing at those who believe in the war on terror and who feel a need to resist Islamic terrorism. He also mocked the courage of journalists who were captured by insurgents. He has openly stated that he wishes to die as a suicide bomber.

On 20 September 2006, Abu Izzadeen and Anjem Choudary disrupted Home Secretary John Reid's first public meeting with Muslims since his appointment. He called Reid an "enemy" of Islam. John Humphrys interviewed Izzadeen on the edition of 22 September 2006 of BBC Radio 4's Today programme. In a heated discussion Abu Izzadeen stated that his aim was to bring about Sharia law in the UK and that this should be achieved without following the democratic process but rather "in accordance to the Islamic methodology".

On 22 March 2017, Izzadeen was incorrectly identified as the perpetrator of the 2017 Westminster attack by a number of news sources, including Channel 4 News and The Independent, until it emerged that he was still in prison. This incorrect information was subsequently added to Izzadeen's Wikipedia page, sparking a conflict among editors over whether it should be included. It was removed once and for all eight hours after the attack, after Channel 4 apologized for incorrectly naming Izzadeen as the attack's perpetrator.

== Arrests and convictions (2007–15) ==
British police arrested Abu Izadeen on charges of inciting terrorism on 2 August 2007. A spokesman for Scotland Yard said the arrest is related to an "on-going inquiry," involving a speech Abu Izadeen gave in the West Midlands area in 2006, which predates 20 September 2006 incident.

Izzadeen was arrested again in a pre-dawn police raid on 24 April 2007 under the Terrorism Act 2000 "in connection with inciting others to commit acts of terrorism overseas and terrorist fundraising".

On 17 April 2008, Izzadeen was among six men convicted at Kingston upon Thames Crown Court of supporting terrorism, while the jury failed to reach a verdict on a third charge of encouraging terrorism. He was subsequently jailed for three and a half years.

On 14 November 2015, Izzadeen and Sulayman Keeler were detained by police in Lőkösháza, Hungary, on a train heading to Bucharest, Romania, because they were not able to identify themselves. During the time of their detention, on 17 November 2015, a European Arrest Warrant appeared in the Schengen Information System against both individuals. The two men did not inform the British authorities about leaving the UK despite the court decision ordering them to do so.

== See also ==
- Abdul-Aziz ibn Myatt
- Khalid Kelly
- Anjem Choudary
- Abu Uzair
- Hassan Butt
- Andrew Ibrahim
- Sulayman Keeler
- Abu Hamza al-Masri
- Omar Bakri Muhammad
