= Sulayman Keeler =

British terrorist

Sulayman Keeler (born Simon Keeler) is a Muslim convert and leader of Ahlus Sunnah wal Jamaah, a British Islamist organisation. He is a former member of Al-Muhajiroun, a banned organisation designated as a terrorist organisation, and led the Society of Converts to Islam.

HSToday report that this is the "first time a white convert has been incarcerated for Islamist terror charges in the UK."'

== Background ==
He has described the 11 September 2001 attacks as "magnificent" and called Queen Elizabeth II an "enemy of Islam and Muslims."

A court sentenced Keeler to twenty-eight days imprisonment after he assaulted a police officer during a demonstration in London in December 1998. Years later, he was again arrested after he assaulted British National Party (BNP) members at a rally.

Keeler held a press conference in London on 18 November 2005, formally 'launching' Ahlus Sunnah wal Jamaah.

In an interview with BBC News, Keeler expressed his opposition to democracy, and compared British Prime Minister Tony Blair to Al-Qaeda leader Osama bin Laden, saying, "I don't believe in democracy. It's man made. You're talking about a government that taxes the people to death. It oppresses many millions of people in the world. It wouldn't be such a shame to have them overturned... Tony Blair sends a bunch of aircraft into Iraq, bombs a bunch of people... Osama Bin Laden, who sends a bunch of aeroplanes into America and bombs a bunch of people - what is the difference? You tell me."

On Thursday 17 April 2008, Keeler was one of 6 individuals found guilty of terror related offences, specifically terrorist fundraising. The others found guilty at Kingston upon Thames Crown Court were Abu Izzadeen, Omar Zaheer, 28, of Southall, west London, Abdul Saleem, 32, of Poplar, east London, and Jalal Hussain. Two others, Ibrahim Abdullah Hussan, 25, from Leyton, east London, and Rajib Kahn, 29, from Luton in Bedfordshire, were released after the jury were unable to decide a verdict.

== See also ==
- Andrew Ibrahim
- Abdul-Aziz ibn Myatt
- Abu Izzadeen
- Anjem Choudary
- Abu Uzair
- Hassan Butt
- Khalid Kelly
- Abu Hamza al-Masri
- Omar Bakri Muhammad
