= Khalid Kelly =

Irish Jihadist

- Born: Terence Edward Kelly; 1967; Dublin, Ireland
- Died: 4 November 2016 (aged 48–49); Mosul, Iraq
- Cause of death: Suicide bombing
- Education: Hospital Diploma in Nursing Studies
- Occupation: Former Nurse
- Known for: Irish Member of ISIL

Khalid Kelly, born Terence Edward Kelly (c. 1967 – 4 November 2016), also known as Abu Osama Al-Irlandi and Taliban Terry, was an Irish Muslim convert and at one time the leader of Al-Muhajiroun in Ireland.

Kelly was once a nurse. He was jailed in Saudi Arabia for making alcohol and transporting a large quantity of Johnnie Walker. Like Yvonne Ridley, he converted to Islam after being imprisoned in Saudi Arabia in 2000. He has three sons.

In November 2016 he was reported to have blown himself up on the orders of the Islamic State of Iraq and the Levant (ISIL) during the Battle of Mosul (2016–17).

== Background ==
Born Terence Edward Kelly in The Liberties, Dublin, he attended Roman Catholic schools there until age 15, when he left to work in pubs.

At 23, he moved to London to train as an intensive care nurse and in 1996 took a job in Riyadh, Saudi Arabia, at the King Faisal hospital, attracted by the tax-free salary, living there for 4½ years. He lived for 3½ years "downtown in a Saudi villa, not in one of the Western compounds. When I'd hear the call to prayer, I'd open the window and turn up the stereo in opposition to what I saw as an imposition."

Although Kelly went to work in Saudi Arabia because the salary was tax free he soon found bigger money in making alcohol, which is a strictly forbidden activity in that country.

Kelly was subsequently caught and sent to jail in 2000, where an Afghan introduced him to Islam. Khalid Kelly, as he was later known, left prison a convert. Kelly recalls: "I got really good at making drink. I had three stills in my house and then I got arrested one day with five cases of Johnny Walker in the back of my car. I was sent to prison for eight months. I lost everything. It was all confiscated. The prison was 150 people in a dormitory with a mosque at the end. I’d been inside for four weeks and was at my lowest point when I was given the Koran in English. Someone explained it to me. And then it was very quick. I saw that God was the creator, the provider, the commander, and the legislator for mankind. It was all suddenly very clear. I felt freer than I had ever been – even though I was in prison."

Kelly also said of this event: "It just filled in all the gaps, you know? It was like the answer to everything I'd every wondered about. There was even a Captain Ali there at the prison, and he gave me a Koran. And I'll always remember it because he wrapped it in a piece of newspaper, you know, because he didn't have any wrapping paper. And he was so happy for me. He was nearly crying, the man." He said, "'I'm so happy you've come to the truth. It will change your life.' And indeed it did", he says. Describing his journey from scepticism to belief, or as he called it "from darkness to light", Kelly said, "the journey started with the illegal production of alcoholic drinks in Saudi Arabia whilst I was working as a nurse at the King Faisal hospital". He went on to say: "Before Islam, I didn’t know the meaning of love. I used to be like other British young men, drinking and going out, but when I read the Quran in 2000, whilst in jail, I felt a huge surge of compassion and sympathy. I feel now that what led me to Islam was God’s mercy and sympathy. It’s something bigger than myself and I can’t explain it with words".

In 2002 Kelly was deported to Britain where he allegedly soon began attending sermons by the radical preacher Omar Bakri Muhammad. Upon his return to Britain Kelly got a job working as a nurse at St Thomas's Hospital, London. However, rumours started that he was a supporter of the Taliban and subsequently lost his job. He became a member of the now disbanded hardline Islamic organisation Al-Mujaharoun, and became the leader of it in Ireland.

Kelly was a member of Ahlus Sunnah wal Jamaah, a British Islamist organisation and a close associate of Sulayman Keeler, Abu Izzadeen, Omar Bakri Muhammed, Abu Hamza al-Masri, Abu Uzair and Anjem Choudary. He was also a member of Al Ghurabaa and The Saved Sect.

In October 2003 Kelly appeared on The Late Late Show on RTÉ One with Pat Kenny, alongside Anjem Choudary.

== Declared fugitive in 2008 ==
In March 2008 it was reported that Khalid Kelly was on the run. After the Danish cartoon controversy and subsequent arrests for having signs which said Kill those who insult the Prophet, Kelly fled the country and began travelling the Muslim world looking for a place to bring his wife and two sons, Osama and the newborn Muhammed.

== Living in Pakistan ==
In a newspaper interview in 2009, Khalid was reportedly living in the Swat Valley in Pakistan and was quoted during the interview as ready to travel to Afghanistan to fight against coalition forces: "Next week, inshallah, I could be in Afghanistan fighting a British soldier."

He returned to Dublin in April 2010, claiming to have been deported from an Eastern European country and to have lost his passport.

== Obama threat ==
In May 2011 Kelly was arrested for threatening to assassinate Barack Obama. In an interview with the Sunday Mirror he said that al-Qaeda was likely to kill Obama on his upcoming trip to Ireland. He reportedly said he would like to do it himself, but was too well known. He stated:

Personally I would feel happy if Obama was killed. How could I not feel happy when a big enemy of Islam is gone?

Following the interview, Kelly was arrested by counter-terrorism officers from Ireland's Special Detective Unit, under Irish terrorism legislation and questioned for a period of 3 days. His house in Dublin's north inner city was searched by specialist police. He was later released without charges and put under surveillance.

== Links to the Islamic State ==
Kelly had been linked to and voiced support for the terrorist group, the self-proclaimed Islamic State of Iraq and the Levant, and in June 2015 he was detained and questioned by detectives attached to the Garda Counter-Terrorism International Unit (CTI) from Garda Headquarters' Crime and Security Branch (CSB). He was later released without charge.

== See also ==
- Abdul-Aziz ibn Myatt
- Abu Izzadeen
- Anjem Choudary
- Abu Uzair
- Hassan Butt
- Andrew Ibrahim
- Sulayman Keeler
- Abu Hamza al-Masri
- Omar Bakri Muhammad
