= Mahee Ferdhaus =

Bangladeshi-born British businessman (born 1973)

Mohammed Mahee Ferdhaus Jalil
- মাহী ফেরদৌস জলীল
- Born: Mahee Ferdhaus Jalil; 13 April 1973 (age 53); Sylhet, Bangladesh
- Other name: Mohammed Ferdhaus
- Occupations: Businessman, television presenter
- Years active: 2003–present
- Known for: Founder of Channel S
- Children: 4

Mohammed Mahee Ferdhaus Jalil (Bengali: মোহাম্মদ মাহী ফেরদৌস জলীল; born 13 April 1973) is a Bangladeshi-born British convicted insurance fraudster, founder of Channel S, owner of Prestige Auto Group and a television presenter.

== Early life ==
Jalil was born on 13 April 1973, into a Bengali Muslim family in Sylhet District, Bangladesh. The family later migrated to the United Kingdom, eventually settling in Southern England.

== Career ==
Jalil founded Channel S which began broadcasting in December 2004. He founded Prestige Auto Group, which later became Diamond Auto Group – based in Walthamstow, London. He also presents a weekly talk show Reality with Mahee which airs every on Channel S.

== Controversy ==
=== Kidnapping ===
On 25 May 2011, Jalil was bundled into a car at gunpoint outside the offices of Channel S in Clifford Road, Walthamstow, London at 1:30 am. He was then driven to an Indian restaurant in West London where he was hooded, bound, beaten, tortured and repeatedly demanded £250,000 ransom. Jalil was eventually released by one of the kidnappers, driven to the edge of London's A406 North Circular Road and given £30 to get a taxi. Jalil made his way home, called the police, and was taken to hospital for treatment for burns and internal injuries.

In June and July 2011, Mohammed Iqbal Hussain, 44, ATN Bangla CEO Hafiz Alam Bakhsh, 39, and businessman Sadek Ali, 41, were charged with conspiracy to kidnap. Later, Abul Aktar, 38, was also charged. In February 2012, after a month-long trial at Snaresbrook Crown, Bakhsh, Ali and Aktar were found not guilty of conspiracy to kidnap, Hussain was found guilty of conspiracy to kidnap, blackmail and assault causing grievous bodily harm. On 15 June 2013, Hussain was sentenced to a 32-year prison term (15 years for kidnap, 10 years for grievous bodily harm and 7 years for blackmail).

Jalil suffered post-traumatic stress disorder and psychological difficulties from the physical and mental ordeal.

=== Insurance fraud ===
Jalil committed money laundering offences in 2008 while awaiting trial for conspiracy to defraud. On 4 August 2008, he was found guilty at Croydon Crown Court for conspiracy to defraud for car insurance fraud over "crash-for-cash" staged accidents between 2002 and 2003 and sentenced to an 18-month prison term. He was released after serving seven months of his term and made his first public appearance at the Channel S Community Awards on 30 March 2009.

Jalil was on bail awaiting trial from the previous fraud when at the time he became involved in the next fraud. Between 2006 and 2010, he accepted at least £500,000 into bank accounts under his control and laundered some of the profits of a £3 million "crash-for-cash" scam, while knowing the money had been defrauded out of insurance companies. Jalil admitted to playing a background role behind Motor Alliance, an insurance company which made at least £1.17 million during the four-year scam. On 8 July 2013, he pleaded guilty to money laundering and admitted to possessing criminal property between 19 July 2006 and 31 October 2010 under the Proceeds of Crime Act 2002 just before he was due to stand trial at Southwark Crown Court.

Between November 2005 and October 2008, at least 124 claims were made by individuals linked to Motor Alliance, a company run by Jalil's brother Mohammed Samsul Haque, in which a series of London-based accident management firms were used as a front to hide fraudulent insurance claims offering storage facilities and replacement vehicle hire.

In October 2011, Haque and five other men were sentenced to a total of more than 12 years in prison following a Metropolitan Police Service investigation called Operation Scarp. Jalil was the final person to be prosecuted under Operation Scarp. In August, he was ordered to pay £84,000 to AXA Insurance.

Jalil initially denied involvement in the scam, but pleaded guilty to money laundering when he appeared before the court in July 2014, just as he was due to stand trial at Southwark Crown Court. He was freed on bail until his sentencing hearing on 13 September. Sentencing was adjourned for a pre-sentence report to be prepared and a psychological report to deal with the incident leading Jalil suffering from post-traumatic stress disorder.

On 17 February 2014, he was sentenced to a three-year prison term for money laundering at Southwark Crown Court. He admitted possessing criminal property and was also banned from being a director for 10 years. He was the final person to be jailed under Operation Scarp.

== See also ==
- British Bangladeshi
- List of British Bangladeshis
