= Channel S =

UK-based television channel targeting the Bangladeshi community

- The current logo of Channel S

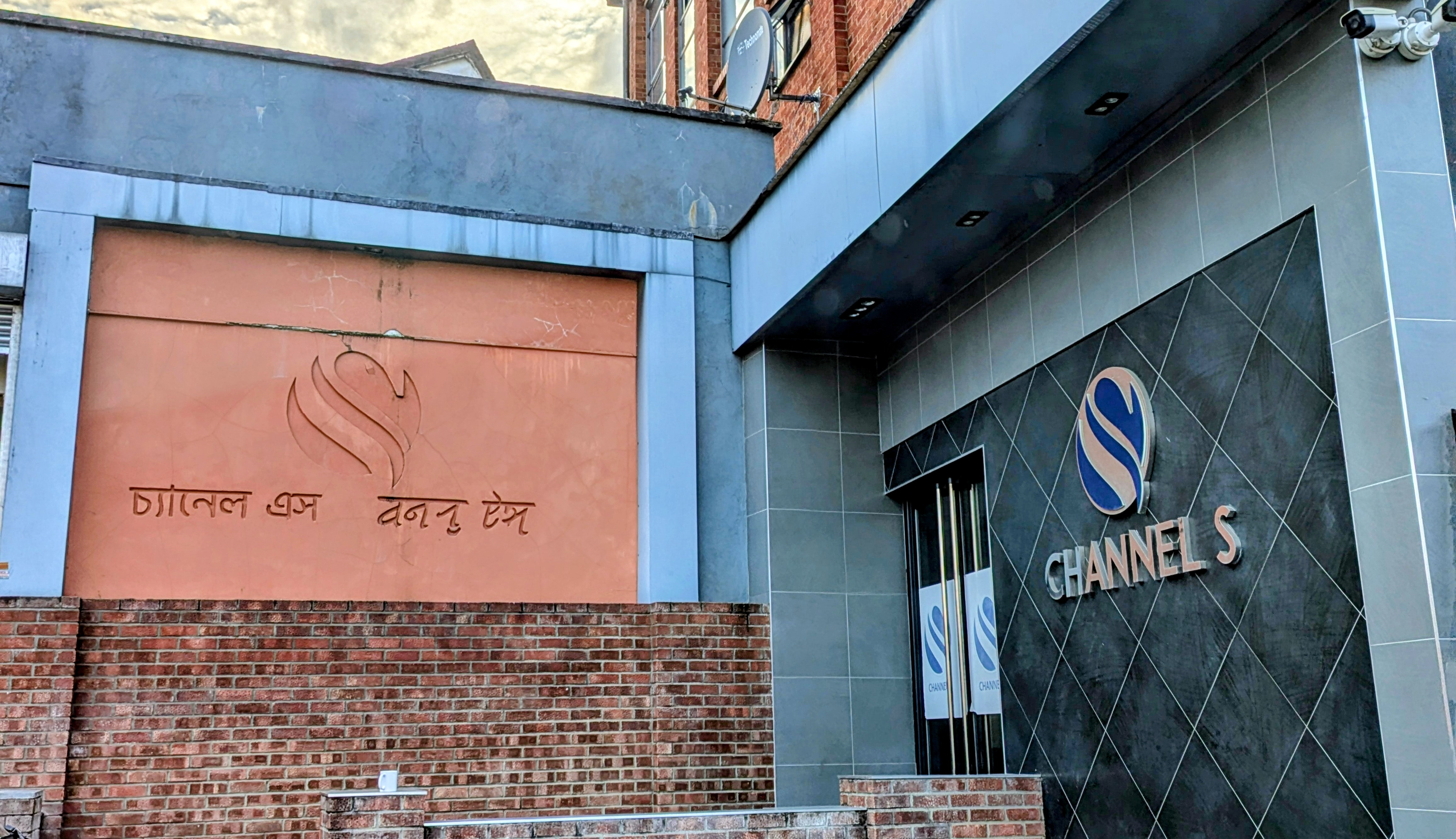
- Channel S studios located in Walthamstow, London, UK
- Country: United Kingdom
- Broadcast area: United Kingdom
- Headquarters: Prestige House, 36 Clifford Road, London, England, UK

Programming
- Languages: Bengali; Sylheti; English
- Picture format: 4:3 (576i, SDTV)

Ownership
- Owner: Chs.Tv Limited

History
- Launched: 16 December 2004; 21 years ago

Links
- Website: www.chsuk.tv

Former Channel S logo

Channel S (Bengali: চ্যানেল এস; Sylheti: ꠌꠦꠘꠦꠟ ꠄꠍ) is a UK-based, free-to-air television channel targeting the British Bangladeshi community. The channel was established on 16 December 2004 by Mahee Ferdous Jalil, a Bangladeshi businessman in London. On Sky it at first had a timesharing deal with ATN Global, and then in 2005 began to broadcast for 24 hours, 7 days a week; it is currently available on Sky channel 777. The channel claims to be the "Voice of British Bangladeshis across the world", showing programmes suiting community needs. Its slogan is "Working for the community".

The television station is based at Prestige House in Walthamstow, north-east London. It broadcasts programmes in Bengali, Sylheti and a few in British English. It is the first Bangladeshi channel to broadcast a significant content in Sylheti which has built up a loyal following among Bangladeshis in the United Kingdom, of whom the majority come from Sylhet. Since the launch of the channel in 2004 there has been bitter rivalry between Channel S and Bangla TV, with Channel S gaining rights to broadcast the Baishakhi Mela. A survey in the UK found Channel S was the most viewed Bengali TV channel in the UK.

== History ==
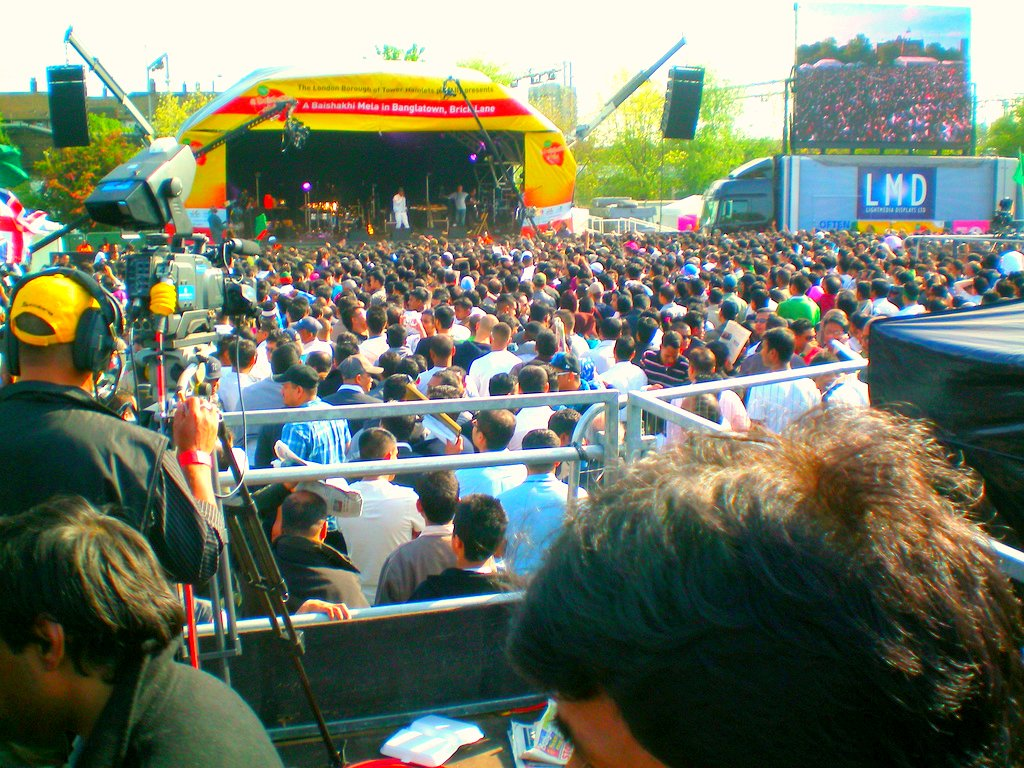
Channel S cameras broadcasting the Baishakhi Mela in 2009 at Weavers Field, east London

On 16 December 2004, Channel S started to broadcast on Sky with a timesharing deal with ATN Global on channel 827. It was founded by a Bangladeshi businessmen based in London, Mahee Ferdous Jalil, who is also the owner of the car insurance company Prestige Auto Group.

In March 2005, it moved to its own EPG channel 837 and started broadcasting 24 hours a day, 7 days a week, and then moved to channel 814.

From 15 January 2006, it aired its programmes in Bangladesh and other countries of South Asia, South East Asia and the Middle East. From August 2006, Channel S acquired the rights to broadcast two of Bangladesh's prominent satellite channels, NTV and ATN Bangla. These are also available on Sky channels 826 and 827 respectively (a few months later it had stopped broadcasting NTV, which became independent from Channel S).

In October 2008, it acquired the rights to broadcast a popular Bangladeshi channel called, Channel i on channel 826. In May 2007, Channel S launched Islam4U – a channel dedicated to Islamic programmes (has stopped broadcasting since).

== Programmes ==
Channel S provides viewers with a combination of cultural, political and religious programmes for the viewers, including shows which help the community with legal or community issues. News is broadcast daily, with news coverage of national news and international news, the main headline and political situation in Bangladesh and the latest news headlines in Britain. Local and community news are also broadcast from correspondents throughout the UK, including a news programme dedicated to news coverage from Sylhet; there is a live bulletin at 7:00 pm, and full news broadcasts at 10:30 pm and 1:00 am.

=== Talk shows ===
Talk show programmes include Obhimoth (English: Opinion), focusing on events of politics in Bangladesh; during the 2008 Bangladesh election it covered the electoral process by broadcasting opinions of voters and communities in the electoral constituencies of Sylhet, Habiganj, Moulvibazar and Sunamganj (Voter Matthe). Let's Talk – hosted by Ajmal Masroor is a programme debating about current and religious affairs.

=== Entertainment ===
There are many Bengali entertainment programmes with Bengali music, drama and shows, including Sylheti drama which are produced in Sylhet and some from East London. Popular entertainment shows include iRonniee (a programme interviewing notable music-songwriters), and music shows of folk, poetry by leading artists in the UK or Bangladesh; these include Sure Sure Alap, Shudhu Binodan, Sur Jolsha and Matir Sur. A new game show launched in February 2008, titled Win A Car, offers people to win a Mercedes C-class, which 'specifically targets the British Bangladeshi community', and has been described as the first entertainment programme in a 'Sylheti Bangla way'. Since 2005, it has gained the rights to broadcast the Baishakhi Mela annually. Previously the rights were held by Bangla TV, however its commitment to the community has attracted many local business and advertisement to Channel S. In 2009, it was the joint media partner with BBC Asian Network, alongside the Tower Hamlets council.

=== Islamic ===
Channel S is one of the first Bengali channels which are committed to broadcasting Islamic-oriented programmes. Islamic programmes are shown quite frequently. These include programmes such as Islam Essentials – a live religious talk show which provides viewers the opportunity to ask questions relating to Islam based on everyday life which features Sheikh Abdur Rahman Madani and Quraner Alo (teaching on how to read the Qur'an). Nasheeds (religious songs) are shown daily. Channel S has planned to launch a channel called Islam4U, which is a 24-hour channel Islamic channel in Bengali, which however has not started broadcasting.

==== Charity Department ====
There are many charity events for Islamic institutes on Channel S. In 2006 and 2007 during Ramadan, the British Bangladeshi community donated millions of pounds on live appeals. It then led to Channel S in 2007 creating a fundraising initiative called, the "Ramadan Family Commitment", which was the channels first concept based scheme. It raised £146,138 in 2007 and was distributed amongst 28 organisations, there were 30 charity appeals, one during each night of Ramadan, and "Qurbani Family Commitment", created to make the distribution of Qurbani during Eid more easier for the Muslim community in the UK, and for Bangladesh. Organisations which are affiliated with the organisations are Islamic Relief, Muslim Aid and Hefazothe Islam UK. During Ramadan, Channel S has also raised fundraising events for mosques and madrassas across the UK (e.g. East London Mosque), and created its first Ramadan Guide in 2008 which was distributed in the communities. As of 2008 Channel S has raised up to £7.5 million for 65 mosques, 17 madrassas and 35 other charity events. It is organised by the Channel S Charity Department, and presented by Rizwan Hussain.

Channel S also launched a new charity programme with Muslim Aid, called "Shahjalal & Shahporan Village", which is dedicated to raising money to build villages for victims of Cyclone Cidr in Bangladesh. Muslim Aid has hosted live appeals on Channel S, along with Islam Channel. With Muslim Aid, it has managed to raise up to over £200,000 from the community, in support of those who were affected by Cyclone Sidr in Bangladesh. A football tournament was part of the fundraising initiative called the SSV Charity Champions Cup 2008, consisting of 32 teams, aiming to bring Bangladeshi footballers together across different towns from London, Oldham and Birmingham. The event was held from 5 May to 6 July 2008, and was won by Bromley By Bow FC in the finals at Mile End Stadium, east London. The aim of the fundraising event is to build two villages which are called Shahjalal & Shahporan, with each receiving 360 built houses, including schools, medical centres and mosques, and aims to raise up to £720,000.

=== Others ===
There are also other various shows available for all other viewers. Programme Bits n Bytes is an IT show specifically targeting people who use computers for business or home use. It is the only IT weekly programme within the South Asian Broadcasting Industry in the UK, presented in English and Sylheti.

Viewers also have the opportunity to view their village or town in Bangladesh, by calling and requesting on programmes such as Amar Gao, there are many recorded videos of villages across the region of Sylhet. There are also shows available for women and children, for example Mojar Ranna (a cooking show) and It's Our Day (entertainment for children).

== Controversy ==
In June 2007, First Solution Money Transfer, a financial services company run by at least one the managing directors of Channel S went into liquidation owing the public hundreds of thousands of pounds. Mahee Ferdous Jalil, the chairman of Channel S, filed for an injunction against Bangla TV to prevent allegations of impropriety by Channel S or its chairman from being broadcast as well as defamations cases against a number of prominent businessmen who had made the allegations.

As of April 2008, Channel S (including other Bengali channels) was under investigation by Ofcom for a breach of the Communications Act 2003, after airing election adverts for the Liberal Democrats during the 2008 London mayoral election. The channel accepted adverts from the local Liberal Democrats candidate, Jalal Rajonuddin. Ofcom found Channel S guilty of breaching the TV Advertising Code.

On 4 August 2008, according to the City of London police, Mahee Ferdous Jalil (Mohammed Ferdhaus) founder of the channel (along with many others) was found guilty, at Croydon Crown Court, of car insurance fraud and sentenced to an 18 months prison term. The group were involved in a plot to make false car insurance claims and were ordered to pay compensation costs to the AXA insurance company. Since the arrest of Jalil, a media war broke out with Channel S and Bangla TV. It was noted that Bangla TV broadcast negative news coverage against Jalil and Channel S, leading to propaganda and different speculations of the event. It raised much concern among the community and politicians, which many thought was an attack against Channel S by Bangla TV. He was released after serving 7 months of his term, as he appeared at the Channel S Community Awards on 30 March 2009. In July 2013, Jalil pleaded guilty to money laundering as part of an insurance scam and was sentenced to three years in prison.

== See also ==
- List of television stations in Bangladesh
