= John Worboys =

British serial rapist (born 1957)

John Radford
- Born: John Worboys; June 1957 (age 69); Enfield
- Other names: John Derek Radford; Black Cab Rapist
- Occupations: Stripper, taxi driver, porn film actor
- Penalty: Life imprisonment, minimum term 8 years (2009); Life imprisonment, minimum term 6 years (2019)

Details
- Span of crimes: 2000–2008
- Date apprehended: 2009

John Derek Radford (born John Worboys, June 1957) is a British convicted serial sex offender, known as the Black Cab Rapist. Worboys was convicted in 2009 for attacks on 12 women, committed between 2007 and 2008. In 2019, he was convicted for attacks on four more women, the earliest of which took place in 2000. Police say he may have had more than 100 victims.

== Early life ==
Born in Enfield, Middlesex, Worboys left school with few qualifications and was employed in jobs including milkman, junior dairy manager and security guard. He lived alone in Rotherhithe, south London, before marrying Kate Santos in 1991; the couple separated after four years. Santos stated that he sexually assaulted her daughter and that he confessed to following home and assaulting another woman. He was in a relationship at the time of his arrest in 2008.

From 1987 to 2000, Worboys worked as a stripper, using "Terry the Minder" as a pseudonym. As "Paul" and "Tony", Worboys directed and appeared in a pornographic film. He hired out his flat in Poole, Dorset, for making pornographic films.

In 1996, Worboys passed The Knowledge, an exam that allowed him to operate as a taxi driver within London. As well as working within London, Worboys worked as a taxi driver in Bournemouth while living at his holiday flat in Poole. He still continued to work as a stripper at night.

== Offending ==
=== Method ===
Worboys was a London black cab driver who picked up women as fares late at night in central London. He would tell each woman he was celebrating coming into a large amount of money, usually by winning the lottery or at a casino, show her a carrier bag full of money to back up his story, and then suggest she drink a glass of champagne with him, which he had drugged with sedatives. After the drugs had taken effect, he would rape or sexually assault his victims. The women often had little memory of what had happened to them.

=== Police investigation ===
The first reports to police concerning suspicious incidents experienced by women in black cabs dated from 2002. Over a period of six years, 14 women between 18 and 34 years of age went to the police to tell of the assault or other worrying experiences in a taxi, all of which had similarities. The police failed to link them.

==== 2006 ====
On 14 October, a 25-year-old woman met Worboys while attempting to return home from a night out in Fulham. After having a drink, she awoke to find Worboys assaulting her and attempting to put his hand inside her underwear. She had a limited memory of the incident, but reported it to the police.

On 10 November, a journalist boarded Worboys' taxi along Regent Street. She had a drink with him before falling unconscious. Hours later, the journalist woke up with no memory.

==== 2007 ====
On 5 April, a 22-year-old woman attempted to travel to Middlesex after attending a birthday party along Oxford Street. Worboys offered to transport her for £30. After she refused to take a drink that he had offered her, he became aggressive.

In the early morning of 29 June, Worboys picked up a young office worker along Regent Street, offering to take her to her home address in Tufnell Park. She could only recall during testimony that she drank 'champagne' that Worboys had given her and that he forcibly kissed her. However, the following day, she noticed bruises on her legs.

The fifth victim only recalled during testimony that she was drugged on an unknown date in July 2007.

A first-year student at Warwick University, Carrie Symonds (who later withdrew her right to anonymity), spent the night of 26 July 2007 out in Fulham. Whilst she was waiting for a bus home at a bus stop on King's Road, Worboys stopped and offered to take her home in his cab. She told him she only had £5 with her. He offered to accept this amount as payment, as he lived in the same area as her and was already heading that way. When offered alcohol, Symonds sensed danger and poured the 'champagne' on the floor of the taxi. After propositioning Symonds to perform a sex act on him for £350, which she refused, Worboys joined her in the back of the taxi. He then offered to give her £50 if she would drink a shot of vodka. Symonds drank the vodka. In her testimony, she stated she could not recall what happened further to this.

After Symonds alighted at her address, Worboys drove to Covent Garden in the West End of London. A 19-year-old Greenwich University student boarded Worboys' taxi, where he offered her a drink that she accepted. After she had the drink, he forced a pill into her mouth. She last remembered drinking in the back of the taxi, with no memory of anything else until the next day. It was found that Worboys had sexually assaulted her whilst she was unconscious. Police seized CCTV footage outside the student's halls of residence, which showed him carrying the unstable student out of his taxi at 0430 BST.

=== Worboys arrested for the first time ===
==== 27 July ====
From this incident, Worboys was identified, and police attended his address, with no reply. Worboys later attended a police station on 27 July, aware that police were looking to speak to him, accompanied by a solicitor. Worboys was arrested for the sexual assault of the 19-year-old student and held at a police station in Plumstead, southeast London, but was released on bail after police believed his protests that she had been drunk and kissed him as she left his cab, which was confirmed by CCTV footage. A search of Worboys' taxi and address were considered by police; however, they assumed that he would have disposed of anything by the time it was considered.

==== October ====
In October, the case against Worboys in relation to the Greenwich University student was dropped. It would be another four months until the case was reopened.

=== Victim 8 ===
==== 21 December ====
A victim reported to police that she was raped by Worboys during the journey from a nightclub in Tottenham Court Road to her home address in Putney. His DNA was located on a semen stain within her underwear.

=== Victim 9 ===
==== 3 January ====
A 29-year-old insurance broker was picked up by Worboys from a pub in the City, where he offered to take her home to Hornchurch, east London, for £20. Worboys asked the woman to perform a sex act, before he exposed himself. She reports this to police.

=== Victim 10 ===
==== 11 January ====
A victim reported to police that she was drugged.

=== Victim 11 ===
==== 31 January ====
A 31-year-old advertising director was collected by Worboys outside a nightclub in Soho, attempting to go to Herne Hill. She drank the 'champagne' that was offered and remembers Worboys assaulting her.

=== Victim 12 ===
==== 5 February ====
After her first night out after her baby was born, a new mother was returning to her home address with a friend in Worboys' taxi, with the friend telling Worboys that she was on maternity leave. Worboys offered a drink, which was accepted by the mother, however, this left her feeling drowsy. She was discovered by her fiancé at their home address, slumped by the toilet, unable to move her legs. It is believed she was raped by Worboys.

=== Victim 13 ===
==== 14 February ====
A 30-year-old journalist took Worboys' cab with a friend from outside a central London restaurant and was given a drink by him. She pretended to sip the drink, having noticed fizzing and a piece of foil in the glass. Worboys asked the woman if, for £5,000, she would perform a sex act. The woman contacted police after Worboys was later arrested.

=== Victim 14 ===
==== 15 February ====
An 18-year-old woman and her friend took Worboys' cab from Oxford Street. Worboys dropped her friend off, before offering the woman a drink, which she initially refused. The woman lost consciousness, however when she came around, she was still in the taxi, with Worboys refusing to let her out.

== Arrest and charge ==
On 16 February 2008, Worboys was arrested. On 18 February 2008, Worboys was charged with one count of rape, four counts of sexual assault and six counts of administering a substance with intent [to commit a sexual offence]. The charges relate to an investigation into five attacks. Police launch an appeal for further information from the public. Total later rises to 14 as more victims come forward.

=== Physical evidence ===
Police found a "rape kit" in the boot of Worboys' Fiat Punto, containing champagne miniatures, plastic gloves, a torch, vibrators, condoms, sleeping tablets, and an ashtray he used to crush drugs. In a safe in Worboys' garage, police found hand-written notes outlining his planned explanations if he was questioned again following his 2007 arrest. These papers were not used in court because he claimed to have written them for his solicitor.

Worboys' DNA was recovered from a semen stain in one woman's underwear, a wristband belonging to another woman was found in his house and a third woman's address was found in his notebook. Forensic evidence linked a vibrator found in his car to another survivor.

== Other victims ==
Worboys' arrest and charge was published in the media, with police appealing to the public for further information. As a result, Victim 13 contacted police.

=== Historic victims ===
Victims that were unrelated to the original police investigation also emerged.

=== 2002 ===
==== Becki Houlston ====
In 2002, Becki Houlston (who withdrew her right to anonymity) was walking to a taxi rank after a night out with friends in Bournemouth, Dorset, when she spotted a black cab, being driven by Worboys, which was unusual among the traditional yellow taxis in the town. Houlston flagged the taxi down as it drove towards her and got in. During the drive to her home address, Worboys told her that he had won at the casino, passing a drink through the glass partition of the taxi. Whilst she did not want to drink it, Worboys was insistent, so she took a sip.

Arriving outside her flat, Worboys wanted to top it up with more 'champagne', which Houlston stated tasted "absolutely vile and had a bitter taste to it". Houlston did not recall being sexually assaulted and the next morning, woke up with no ill effects, and went to work. She thought nothing more of the incident until 2009, when she saw the news that Worboys would give victims 'champagne', telling them he had won the lottery or at the casino. She saw his eyes and knew that the taxi driver who had done the same was Worboys, recalling how it sent a chill down her, knowing she was that close to him. This started flashbacks of the event and anxiety about getting into taxis. When Houlston learned Worboys was to be released, she was outraged and contacted a solicitor to make a statement. From this, the Metropolitan Police asked her to make a statement; however, the Crown Prosecution Service later told Houlston that there was not enough evidence to charge Worboys.

=== 2003 ===
==== 'Deborah' ====
'Deborah' (not her real name) was picked up by Worboys after a work function. She later recalled Worboys claiming he had won the lottery, only having flashbacks of what occurred, with her next memory being waking up the following afternoon. Worboys had raped Deborah.

==== 'Fiona' ====
'Fiona' (not her real name; described in court documentation as 'DSD') was picked up by Worboys, on her way home to her young baby, having been out celebrating a friend's birthday. Worboys told Fiona that he had won a lot of money and offered Fiona what she described as a "very strong orange liqueur". She later recalled that she remembered Worboys getting into the back of the taxi to have a cigarette with her, putting his arm around her, complimenting her. The next thing Fiona remembered was waking up in Whittington Hospital the following morning. She recalled that as soon as she woke up, she knew she had been raped, detailing that she discovered her tampon had fallen out and her vagina was covered with lubricant. On reporting it to police that morning, a urine sample was taken, indicating traces of the active ingredient within Nytol sleeping pills (however, at that time, the significance was not noted).

== Trial ==
Worboys pleaded not guilty to all 23 counts brought against him, with his trial beginning on 20 January 2009. The fourteen women he attacked testified in court. Worboys claimed to have engaged in "banter" with the women "to get their attention", due to not getting "attention and cuddles" when growing up. He said that any sex was consensual.

His defence counsel described Worboys as an "oddball", a "weird customer" and a "socially inadequate individual", but told the jury it did not mean Worboys was guilty, saying: "What have the prosecution got? They have got a lot of young women who had a very strange experience in the back of a taxi. It is not normal to be offered a drink by a taxi driver. The temptation for the jury is to say he is weird, he must have done it. Don't fall into that trap."

=== Verdict and sentencing ===
Worboys was convicted at Croydon Crown Court on 13 March 2009 of one count of rape, five sexual assaults, one attempted assault and 12 drugging charges, committed from July 2007 to February 2008. He was cleared of two counts of drugging. He was sent for a pre-sentencing report and a psychiatric report, and was sentenced on 21 April. He received an indeterminate sentence of imprisonment for public protection with the minimum custodial term set at eight years.

Mr Justice Penry-Davey said he would not be released until the parole board decided he no longer presented a threat to women. He also ordered Worboys banned from driving a passenger vehicle for profit.

== Subsequent developments ==
=== Inquiry into the police investigation ===
This case highlights real concerns about the overall police response and the culture. There was also a culture that a black cab driver could not possibly have committed these offences.

— Deborah Glass, IPCC commissioner

The commander of Greenwich police, Chris Jarratt, 49, was moved on due to failings in this inquiry and an unrelated murder investigation. A spokeswoman for Women Against Rape said, "We hope that some senior officers will face dismissal over this and similar cases". The handling of Worboys' case was brought before the Independent Police Complaints Commission, who concluded that proper investigations could have prevented some of the attacks. Worboys' case was followed by criticisms about the police in connection with another prolific serial sex offender Kirk Reid, who escaped apprehension despite being connected with a string of sex crimes four years before his arrest.

Five officers had complaints against them upheld, but all were allowed to remain in their jobs. This decision was criticised by one of the survivors and her lawyers, who say that she was laughed at by the police when she reported her assault. Following this case, the Metropolitan Police created a central intelligence unit to investigate serial sex offenders.

'Fiona', who had been raped by Worboys in 2003, later recalled that when she reported the matter to police two days later, she was told that she was "not believable" and that a black cab driver "just wouldn't do that". Prior to her interview, police told her not to be "too emotional" during the video recorded interview, as it would "confuse" the jury, if the matter went to court and that they needed "clean, hard facts", telling her to be "as concise as possible about what had happened". This meant Fiona detached herself, speaking as if the incident had happened to someone else. An interviewing officer told her that she was not coming across "as a credible witness", because she was not upset or crying. Attempting to tell her what she had been told to do, he told Fiona that she was not believable.

'Deborah', who had been raped by Worboys in 2003, later recalled that when she reported the incident, the police told her that Worboys was "already going to prison, so just give your statement in". They added that the CPS was "not going to press charges because he's already in prison and it's a waste of public money".

=== Worboys appeals conviction ===
On 28 May 2010, Worboys applied for permission to appeal his conviction. On 15 June 2010, judges denied the appeal.

=== Later developments ===
Police believed that in 13 years as a taxi driver, Worboys could have drugged and attacked more than 100 female passengers. In a statement following the verdict, the police called for any other women who may have been attacked by Worboys to come forward.

By October 2010, the Metropolitan Police had received 102 additional complaints from women in London and Dorset, with 19 more victims coming forward since he had been convicted.

Two unnamed women, who were sexually assaulted by Worboys, received damages from the Metropolitan Police in February 2014 after it was concluded their human rights had been breached by "inhuman or degrading treatment" during the police investigation. The women were awarded compensation of a total of £41,250. The Met lost its appeal against the decision in 2015. As a result of this case, a hearing was held at the Supreme Court in March 2017 to establish whether survivors should be able to sue the police under Article 3 of the European Convention on Human Rights (under which it was decided to pay damages to the two women).

=== Proposed release and legal challenge ===
In June 2013, a psychologist noted that Worboys maintained that he was innocent and lacked engagement in offence-focussed programmes. Another psychologist noted that Worboys thoughts remained the same in January 2015, but that he was "in the early stages of personal change". As had been concluded before, Worboys' risk had not reduced.

However, on 18 May 2015, with approximately 9 months until the minimum term Worboys had to serve before eligibility to be released on parole, Worboys admitted he was responsible for his offending. In July of that year, he explained his "change of heart" to a psychologist, where the psychologist noted Worboys appearing nervous and occasionally tearful.

Worboys stated that he had "always felt guilty", with then recent media coverage of historical abuse cases only intensifying those feelings. He felt he had to give victims "their due" and "say thank you" in taking responsibility, in regard to then recent compensation claims and how they had been "fair", regarding the accounts of his offences. He repeatedly told the psychologist that he wanted to be honest, wanting to talk about "everything".

Worboys outlined that whilst he had previously maintained hope that his convictions would be overturned, he now thought that this was unrealistic, which provided further motivation for him to take responsibility for his offending.

From this, the psychologist took Worboys' explanation as genuine, recommending that Worboys commenced with the Sexual Offender Treatment Programme (SOTP). Meanwhile, on 10 September 2015, at Worboys' first post-tariff review by the Parole Board, they did not recommend release or that Worboys should be transferred to a lower-category, open prison. Their conclusion was that Worboys' risk remained "too high to be managed in other than closed conditions". Section 28(7) of the Crime (Sentences) Act 1997 meant that Worboys was not eligible for a Parole Board hearing for a further two years.

In November 2015, Worboys completed the SOTP Foundation programme, before completing the SOTP Core programme in October 2016.

In early 2017, preparations began for Worboys' next Parole Board review. A risk assessment by the National Offender Management Service (NOMS) concluded that Worboys remained a high risk of serious harm if he was released, but that he was at low risk of reoffending. On 28 February, it was again concluded that Worboys was not suitable to be released or moved to an open prison.

On 12 April 2017, Worboys' offender manager completed a report for the Parole Board, in which he stated how Worboys, describing his rape conviction, had "only placed his penis inside the victim's vagina for approximately four seconds and had removed it when asked to do so". Regarding the assault by penetration charge, where it was alleged he had used a vibrator to penetrate the vagina of a victim, Worboys stated that he "only used the vibrator under the victim's skirt and over her legs and did not put it inside her vagina". Despite explaining this, he stated that he did not want to "minimise the offence". It was the opinion of Worboys' offender manager that he should not be released or moved to an open prison, given the risk of serious harm and similar reoffending remaining harm and that there was outstanding "core risk reduction work", which should be undertaken within a closed prison.

On 16 March 2017, a registered and chartered forensic psychologist, who had previously assessed Worboys in August 2015 (from instructions of his solicitors), produced a "Structured Assessment of Risk and Need Report". It was noted how Worboys had admitted he had planned his offending "meticulously" and that his offending was related to the breakup of his relationship with his partner in 2005/2006. However, it was recommended that Worboys was not suitable at that time to be released or move to an open prison. It was stated that he required "further work to target the full breadth of his treatment needs". It was recommended that before Worboys was moved to open conditions or released, he was "given the opportunity to learn about the potential risks associated with pornography use on the internet". The review stated that there was "sufficient evidence of risk reduction to recommend a review of his security category" and that once Worboys was downgraded from being a Category A prisoner, he would be "required to spend a period in high security conditions as a Category B prisoner, before being considered for progression". The report added that if Worboys continued to "maintain the progress he has made and the protective factors continue to be strongly present", it was the view of the psychologist that "he will be ready for progression to a category C establishment".

On 30 May 2017, Worboys' solicitors wrote to the Parole Board to seek an oral hearing, with their representations seeking Worboys being transferred to an open prison. Their representations noted it would take a "brave Parole Board" to consider a Category A prisoner moving to an open prison, but acknowledged that transition for a period of time through a Category C prison would be better. On 8 June, the Parole Board granted the request for an oral hearing.

On a separate occasion, on 8 August 2017, the Secretary of State determined that Worboys should remain as a Category A prisoner, as "there was insufficient evidence of risk reduction".

Worboys' solicitors requested that a consultant clinical and forensic psychologist speak to him, with an interview lasting approximately 3 1/2 hours, where Worboys discussed his offending. The Risk of Sexual Violence Protocol was considered against Worboys, determining that he was low risk. This assessment was based on his offending having taken place over an 18 month period, with Worboys presentation at that time "one of openness and full accounts of the offences" having been developed.

The Parole Board requested that a further forensic psychological assessment was completed, which was commissioned by the Secretary of State, before being provided on 11 September 2017, in the form of an "addendum psychological report". The report stated that Worboys had "demonstrated a very good understanding of victim empathy" and he had "expressed remorse and shame for his offending behaviour", noting this was related to a breakup that he had been dwelling on in the build-up to offending. The conclusion of the psychologist was that Worboys presented a low risk of sexual reoffending and that "a cautious option" would be Worboys being allowed to progress to lower category closed conditions. The report added that "Worboys' risk could safely be managed in open conditions and if he were released on license".

After a hearing about his case in November 2017, the Parole Board had decided to approve his release with "stringent" licence conditions. He would have to report to probation staff every week and was barred from contacting any of his survivors. Worboys' period on licence would last for at least ten years and he could be sent back to prison if he breached any licence conditions.

On 4 January 2018, the BBC reported that Worboys was to be released from prison. Worboys, who was by now 60 years old, had spent 10 years in custody including a period on remand. It was reported that Worboys had changed his surname to Radford.

The following day, Nick Hardwick, the chairman of the Parole Board, apologised "unreservedly" after it was reported that some of Worboys' survivors had not been informed about his pending release and The Guardian reported that Richard Scorer, the lawyer for several of Worboys' alleged survivors whose cases were not included in the original criminal prosecution, was ready to bring fresh prosecutions against him. On 28 March 2018 Hardwick resigned as Parole Board chair following a successful legal challenge quashing its decision to release Worboys.

In November 2018, it was announced that Worboys would remain in prison.

=== Further convictions ===
On 1 May 2019, Worboys was charged with four further sexual offences alleged to have occurred between 2000 and 2008, following a review of evidence by the Crown Prosecution Service. A hearing date was set for 23 May. In June 2019 he admitted the attacks on four women:

==== CJ ====
On a night out in 2001, CJ left a wine bar in central London, hailing Worboys' taxi. Worboys told her he was celebrating a win on the horses, offering CJ 'champagne'. Stopping in a road off the A40, Worboys served her what appeared to be red wine in a plastic cup; this was CJ's last memory. When she awoke, she was naked in her bed, with her clothes in a trail across the floor. CJ had no physical injuries and did not think that she had had sex. However, unusually, she noticed the door was not bolted and she had more money in her purse than expected.

==== HM ====
In 2003, HM was a university student, who lived just off Edgware Road. One evening, she went on a night out with friends, including another woman, CD, who shared her house. Leaving a central London nightclub in the early hours of the morning, the pair hailed Worboys' taxi. Worboys told them that he had won the lottery and as the pair were his last passengers, he would not charge them a fare. Worboys offered the pair a drink and on arriving back at HM's address, HM stayed in the taxi, accepting a drink, with her friend leaving and going into the house.

HM's next memory was being in Worboys' taxi, somewhere near the Edgware Road, potentially in the Paddington Basin area. HM had a fleeting memory of Worboys being "in her face", but did not remember the detail. HM remembered Worboys giving her more to drink, with her next recollection being in the taxi, parked outside her address. It appeared to be early morning and she was lying on the floor of the taxi. Asking Worboys what had happened, he told her she had fallen to the floor. Worboys helped her out of his taxi and HM went into the house, feeling very unwell the following day and with a sense of anxiety. HM went to Edgware Road police station to report the matter, but could not bring herself to go in and speak to anyone.

==== FP ====
In August 2007, FP had been out with friends in a Chelsea nightclub, leaving at approximately 02:30 BST. She hailed Worboys' taxi and he told her that he had won money at the casino. FP later recalled being shown a bag of money, as well as a bottle of 'champagne' that Worboys repeatedly asked FP to have a drink from. Eventually, FP agreed. When the taxi pulled up in Lots Road, Fulham, Worboys got into the back of the taxi, offering FP a drink in a white plastic cup. FP later recalled being in the back of the taxi for approximately 15 minutes, with her next memory being the following morning at approximately 10:00 BST, having no recollection of getting home.

==== LB ====
In 2007 or 2008, LB was out drinking with a friend. Along with her friend, LB hailed Worboys' taxi. He told the women he had won the lottery, showing miniature bottles of 'champagne', asking if they wanted to celebrate. LB drank some 'champagne', before stopping, thinking she should not have taken the drink from a stranger. LB's friend was dropped off and the taxi continued for the remainder of the short journey to LB's address. LB later recalled how the taxi arrived outside her address, but could not remember getting from the taxi into her flat.

The following morning, LB awoke in her bed, in a position unusual to her normal sleeping pattern. She was undressed, but still wearing underwear, with no signs she had been assaulted. LB was "quite floaty" the next day. In 2009, when Worboys was arrested, LB saw a photograph of him, immediately recognising Worboys. Believing there was no evidence that anything had happened to her, LB decided not to make a complaint. However, further coverage of Worboys' offending caused her to approach and make a complaint to police. On 20 December 2018, LB identified Worboys in an identity procedure.

=== Second trial, conviction and sentence ===
On 23 May 2019 Worboys appeared via video link at Westminster Magistrates' Court from HMP Wakefield, West Yorkshire.

On 20 June 2019, Worboys pleaded guilty to two counts of administering a stupefying or overpowering drug with intent to commit rape or indecent assault and two counts of administering a substance with intent to commit a sexual offence, under the Sexual Offences Act 2003.

On 17 December 2019, Worboys was sentenced to two life sentences with a minimum term of six years for attacking the four women; the earliest of the offences occurred in 2000, five years before previously known attacks. It was revealed in court that Worboys had confessed to a psychologist that he had pushed alcohol on 90 women, of whom a quarter had been drugged.

Worboys lost his appeal against his sentence, at a hearing with three judges in London in February 2021. At the hearing, the Lord Chief Justice, Lord Burnett, confirmed that there was "no error in Mrs Justice McGowan's approach to sentencing Worboys in 2019 and that the minimum term was not excessive."

== Worboys' account of his offending ==
While in custody, Worboys discussed his offending with psychologists on various occasions. He explained how he offered passengers drinks in December 2005 and June 2006 without offending (he later stated that his first offence had been committed in December 2005, after the breakdown of his relationship in August 2005).

Worboys stated that in September 2006, he went to strip clubs and watched pornographic videos with an older man. One of the videos showed an actress being drugged by her boyfriend and raped. Worboys stated that this was a trigger for an interest in women in their mid-20s and that the trigger for his offending was the break-up with a partner in 2005 (which he had previously given as a reason for his offending starting).

Worboys continued, stating that he waited for a week due to being anxious about being caught. He stated that thereafter, there were "11 subsequent occasions when he offended", describing his planning as "very careful". Worboys stated that he gave 11 of the 12 victims half a Temazepam tablet, concerned that he did not cause "too much harm". Worboys stated that he would then touch their leg or look up their skirt whilst he touched himself. Worboys added that he "touched the breasts of one victim" and had "used a vibrator against the tops of the legs of another", but denied penetration had occurred. He added it was his aim to ejaculate, but often the victim would wake up, causing him to panic and return immediately to the taxi's driver's seat and continue the journey.

In speaking about the victim he admitted he had raped, Worboys stated that this had occurred before Christmas 2007, when he "felt angry towards his partner". He explained how the woman had "boasted that she could take any drug", to which Worboys said he initially gave her a vitamin tablet, telling her it was ecstasy. When she complained the tablet had no effect, Worboys decided to give her a whole Temazepam tablet. As a result, he stated he was able to go further than in previous actions, penetrating her with his penis, but that this had been "for approximately four seconds". He noted how the victim became "briefly conscious", telling him to "get off her", before she lost consciousness again. Worboys stated that he masturbated before driving home, with the victim making "no further comment about the assault". Worboys stated this was the only occasion when he had raped someone, adding that he had committed "sexual touching after the single act of rape", but "did not consider that he would have attempted penetrative sex again".

Worboys stated that after he resumed the relationship, he did not reoffend until June 2006. Worboys added that the sexual assaults became more regular from October 2006, with the immediate trigger being his partner contacting him after they had broken up, asking him to collect her after a night out, suggesting that she return home with him. Worboys stated that he picked her up, but that she was heavily intoxicated and he had to take her to her mother's address. Worboys said that he was "enraged" by her intoxication and decided to act, fetching drugs and drink before searching for a victim that night.

As well as using Temazepam, Worboys stated that he used Nytol on one occasion, when a victim told him she was going to be sick.

== Psychology of Worboys' offending ==
Psychologists who have spoken to Worboys have concluded that Worboys "adopted a deceptive persona", having gradually developed a plan to offend. Worboys enabled himself to "create a fantasy as a seducer, which made him feel powerful and virile", by seeking out women who had characteristics that he despised.

It was noted that Worboys' offending behaviour was linked to his dwelling on his relationship breakdown in 2005 or 2006 (with one woman), with the "lack of intimacy" in a later relationship at the time of his offending, causing him to feel "unhappy and unsatisfied". It was stated that Worboys had "problems with intimate relationships".

== In media ==
The 2026 ITV series Believe Me dramatises Worboys' crimes and his conviction. He is played by Daniel Mays.

== See also ==
- Effects and aftermath of rape
- Laws regarding rape
- List of serial rapists
