= Rizwan Hussain =

Bangladeshi-born British television presenter, barrister (born 1973)

- রেজওয়ান হুসেইন
- Born: 7 December 1973 (age 52); Habiganj District, Bangladesh
- Education: Bachelor of Laws, Master of Laws
- Alma mater: University of Derby; Nottingham Trent University; City University London; Anglia Ruskin University; Lincoln's Inn
- Occupations: Television presenter, barrister
- Years active: 1991–present
- Employer: TV One
- Spouse: Halimah Bint Ashraf
- Children: 2
- Website: pit.uk.com/rizwan/

Rizwan Hussain (Bengali: রেজওয়ান হুসেইন Rezwan Husein; born 7 December 1973) is a Bangladeshi-born British television presenter, barrister and an international humanitarian worker. He is currently the CEO of TV One, broadcasting on Sky Channel 781. He is also a former Hindi music singer and producer and is best known for presenting Islamic programs and charity events on TV One, Islam Channel and Channel S.

== Background ==
Hussain was born in Bangladesh, and moved to the United Kingdom at a young age with his parents. His parents settled in Loughborough, Charnwood, Leicestershire. His late father was a retired soldier of the British Army.

== Education ==
Hussain studied at the University of Derby where he studied Law and then at the City University London where he studied to become a barrister and was called to the Bar at Lincoln's Inn in 2006. Subsequently, he went on to qualify as a lecturer at the Nottingham Trent University by completing a PGCE in Further Education. He obtained an LLM in International Litigation & Dispute Resolution from City, University of London and is presently studying for a PhD in Artificial Intelligence and the Law at Anglia Ruskin University.

== Career ==
Hussain is CEO of TV One, a channel broadcasting on Sky (781, he has previously worked as a lecturer of law and human rights lawyer. He has also been a police officer, journalist, actor and singer. He is a television presenter on TV One, Islam Channel and Channel S, and is known for presenting Islamic and charity shows.

In the late 1990s, Hussain became interested in music, began performing under the band name Sargam, and eventually became known as a songwriter of popular albums, including B-Boy, featuring songs such as "Harr Pal Mujko" and "Jaan". He has appeared on the top Asian music shows on Vectone TV and ATN Global. During his music career, he had a hit single in the UK's Asian charts, which he was performing at various notable stadiums such as Wembley Arena in London, White Pearl in Birmingham and also in Scotland at the Central Park Glasgow.

== Media and charity work ==
In 2005, after performing the Hajj, Hussain left his music career and decided to work with Islamic-oriented channels and charity organisations, such as Muslim Aid, Muslim Charity and Islamic Relief, on presenting many charity events on Islam Channel and Channel S. On Islam Channel, he is a presenter, producer and documentary director, and currently presents a children's program called National Qir’at Competition. On Channel S, he has presented Islam Essentials, which gives answers to people's questions about Islam in English and Bengali, as well as flagship contemporary youth discussion show Thinking Allowed.

Hussain travelled to Bangladesh during the aftermath of Cyclone Sidr in 2008 which left millions homeless. He went with Muslim Aid to assist in delivering water, food and clothing goods to the affected communities, alongside Abdul Jolil Miah and Sheikh Abdur Rahman Madani.

== Attack in Bangladesh ==
On 14 April 2008, Hussain was assaulted by Bangladeshi airport officials at the Shahjalal International Airport in Dhaka. He was assisting an elderly woman with her daughter who had ticket problems, but entered a restricted part of the airport. He was then suspected of human trafficking by the officials, and was taken into a room, and beaten up for up to 55 minutes by the security officers. Later he was forced to sign a false statement, admitting to be involved with human trafficking. The effects of the attack included broken bones of his right leg and left arms, and bruises to most of his upper body, leaving him unable to walk.

An investigation was carried out of the incident, which resulted in the suspension and arrests of the officers involved in the attack, and there was much campaign against the attack by the Bangladeshi community in the UK, with media attention by Channel S. On 26 April 2008 demonstrations were held at Altab Ali Park near Brick Lane and Whitechapel, campaigned by the Bangladesh Human Rights Coalition, with petitions being signed online, demanding the trials of the officers, and apologies from the Caretaker government and the military.
