= Kirk Reid =

English criminal

- Born: 1964 or 1965 (age 61–62)
- Occupations: Chef, football coach
- Status: Incarcerated
- Convictions: Rape (two counts); assault by penetration (three counts), indecent assault (21 counts), possession of indecent images of children (two counts)
- Penalty: Life imprisonment, minimum term seven-and-a-half years (2009)

Details
- Span of crimes: 1984–2007
- Country: United Kingdom
- Date apprehended: 2008

Kirk Reid (born 1964 or 1965) is an English convicted rapist and serial sex offender. In 2009, Reid was convicted of two rapes, 26 sexual assaults and possession of indecent images of children.

== Early life and career ==
Kirk Reid was raised by his mother in Battersea, London, until the age of nine, and then spent time periodically in the care system. Reid has three brothers, some of whom are half-siblings; one of them was a Metropolitan Police constable at the time of Reid's arrest.

Reid made his living as a chef, and at the time of his arrest, he was head chef at Camberwell College. Reid's avocation was football, and he refereed and coached amateur matches in the Wimbledon district league and Battersea Park, sometimes for teams of children and women. Reid's criminal notoriety and work with children prompted the Football Association (FA) to issue the statement that "The FA would like to make it very clear that Kirk Reid was not a qualified FA youth football coach and did not undertake a mandatory FA CRB check."

At the time of his arrest in 2008, Reid lived in Cavendish Road, Balham, with his partner of five years, and owned a second property nearby.

== Criminal history ==
Police believe that Reid may have been responsible for more than 70 sexual assaults over a period of 23 years. Reid's pattern involved driving around South London districts—most frequently Tooting and Balham, close to where he lived—looking for women walking home alone. Waiting for them to be distracted or occupied, he would then attack them from behind. Reid's victims ranged in age from 28 to 61, and at least one woman was visibly pregnant.

At Reid's trial in 2009, a woman testified that Reid had raped her near his own home in Battersea in 1984. The woman was 17 years old, and did not report the rape to police at the time. Reid has not been charged with her rape. Another woman accused Reid of raping her in Balham in 1995. She reported the rape after his arrest in 2008, and Reid admitted having sex with her, but claimed it was consensual. That same year, Reid was accused and acquitted of indecent assault after a woman claimed he attacked her in an alley.

One of Reid's victims was attacked and sexually assaulted by him in September 2001, after she had got off the night bus in Tooting.

In 2002, police discovered links between 26 sexual assaults in the Wandsworth area of London dating back two years, and Reid was detained after a woman complained of being followed by him, but no further action was taken. In both 2004 and 2006, a car matching the description of Reid's red Volkswagen Golf was witnessed in connection with two separate sexual assaults, once via CCTV.

== Arrest ==
In 2008, the serious crime unit of the Metropolitan Police took over the investigation into the series of assaults, and within hours they named Reid as a suspect. Reid was arrested five days after a DNA test positively linked him to several attacks.

Once in custody, Reid's half-brother Roger, a police constable, visited his cell and asked him directly if he was guilty of the rapes. Reid replied, "I did it", a confession he later retracted.

== Conviction ==
In March 2009, Reid was convicted at Kingston upon Thames Crown Court of two rapes and 26 sexual assaults committed in southwest London from 1995–2007, for which he was sentenced to life imprisonment. He was also found guilty of two counts of possessing indecent images of children on his home computer. The judge recommended that Reid serve at least seven-and-a-half years before being considered for release.

In January 2018, more than a year after Reid's recommended non-parole period had elapsed, the Parole Board announced that his case had come up for review "following the standard six-month process for all indeterminate sentence prisoners". In September 2018, Reid's request for release was denied, and the board ruled that he could request release again in 2020.

== Subsequent developments ==
Reid's uninterrupted crime spree, like that of another prolific serial rapist, the black cab driver John Worboys, was largely blamed on the failure of the police to successfully investigate sexual assaults, and led to procedural changes in the London Metropolitan Police's handling of rape and sexual assault crimes. John Yates, an assistant police commissioner at the time, stated that "Nothing can adequately excuse the failure to follow up straightforward lines of inquiry that should have seen Reid arrested" in 2004—four years before his actual arrest.

The handling of the police investigation was reviewed by the Independent Police Complaints Commission, which concluded that a "sustained failure" had occurred to "tackle a long-standing pattern of offences". Three senior officers were subject to misconduct hearings for the errors made in the investigations, including not taking Reid's DNA sample when he became a police suspect. Deborah Glass, IPCC Commissioner for London, said "The failure to take a serial sex offender off the streets of London years earlier is a shameful chapter in the history of the Metropolitan Police Service."

== See also ==
- List of serial rapists
