= Boishakhi Mela =

Bengali celebration

Coordinates: 51.5226°N 0.0695°W

Boishakhi Mela বৈশাখী মেলা
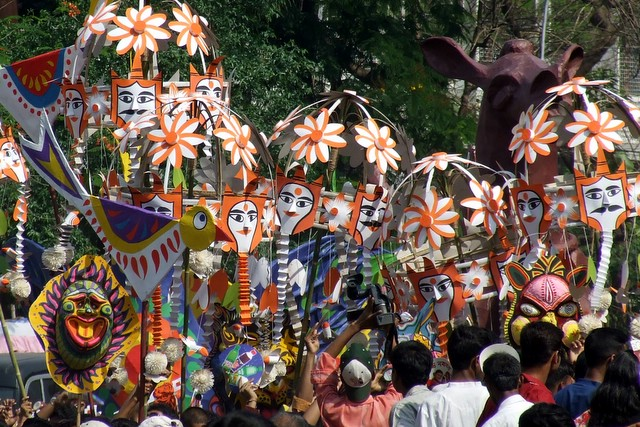
- Observed by: Bengalis (Bangladeshi diaspora)
- Type: Social and cultural festival celebrated by the Bengali diaspora.
- Frequency: Annual
- Related to: Bengali New Year

The Boishakhi Mela (Bengali: বৈশাখী মেলা, romanized: Boishakhi Mela, lit. 'Fair of Boishakh') is a Bengali celebration (mela) which takes place outside of Bangladesh. It is celebrated by the Bangladeshi diaspora in the United Kingdom, United States, Canada as well as many other countries with significant Bangladeshi populations.

In London, it takes place across the area of Banglatown in Tower Hamlets. The festival runs through Brick Lane to Weavers Fields and Allen Gardens in Bethnal Green. The event is a celebration of the Bengali New Year, with musical and cultural events held. It is the largest open-air Asian festival in Europe and the largest Bengali festival outside of Bangladesh. After the Notting Hill Carnival, it is the second-largest street festival in the United Kingdom attracting over 80,000 visitors from across the country. Although the Bengali New Year falls on 14 April (Pohela Boishakh in the Bengali calendar), the festival is held in the second weekend of May on a Sunday to avoid the period of higher risk of rain during the month of April. Having started in 1997, the 10th anniversary of the mela was celebrated in 2007.

== History ==
The Boishakhi Mela was launched in Banglatown located in London's Tower Hamlets borough - the most populated Bangladeshi area outside of Bangladesh. It is a celebration of the Bengali New Year and has been celebrated by the British Bangladeshi community since 1997. The original event based in Bengal is called Pohela Boishakh. The festival was created for the purpose of the Bangladeshi diaspora living in the UK. It was organised by the local people, and is now managed by the Boishakhi Mela Trust Ltd, a non-profit organisation.

The Boishakhi Mela is a unique festival, which has been created by a generation of Bangladeshi people who want to celebrate the Bengali New Year. It inspires the Bangladeshi diaspora to be more creative during the arrival of the event, through the production and the presentation skills of excellent and innovative ideas through participation in the Boishakhi Mela, including the stage planning, music and dancing. Other than creating the event for the purposes of celebrations for the community, it also aims to gain recognition of fellow Bengalis in the West, by providing Bengali culture, and by encouraging them to participate in the event as well as recognising the Bangladeshi presence in the area. Also providing the people the skills and opportunities for the young aspirations as well as professional artists to perform their music or dances.

Previously Bangla TV was the main broadcaster of the Boishakhi Mela event, however since 2005, Channel S has acquired the rights to broadcast the event due to its commitment to the community (the slogan is working for the community), achieving popular support from the main sponsors within the community.

== Procession in London ==
The event starts first during the morning from 12am at Allen Gardens, through Brick Lane and ends in Weavers Fields. This is known as the Grand Parade, where there are women and children dressed in colourful traditional clothes and masks. There will also be musicians or drummers, including dancers and also the leaders from the community. During the 2008 Mela, a great emperor was leading the parade symbolising the traditional landlord (zamindar) of the Indian subcontinent, along with a tiger, an elephant on wheels, rickshaws, and many others. Brick Lane, which is home to many Bangladeshi-owned Indian restaurants, serves curry along the streets for the visitors, with traditional Bengali cuisine meals, cooked by prominent chefs from Bangladesh.

The Tower Hamlets council poster of the Boishakhi Mela

After the parade, begins the music programme with famous music artists from Bangladesh and the UK, dancers and actors performing. The four stages will host Bengali music, theatre including Sylheti drama, and there will also be dance displays throughout the day. The music performed features a wide range of Bengali music, these include traditional Bengali or folk songs, as well as modern, contemporary music, and rap music in Bengali and Sylheti.

=== 2009: Tower Hamlets council ===
Since 2009, the management and planning of the mela was undertaken by the Tower Hamlets Council for the long-term, who called the event "a Boishakhi Mela in Banglatown Brick Lane". It was held on 10 May 2009, attracting up to 95,000 people which is a record high of the event. There were more than 250 school children, dancers, musicians and community groups which participated in the event alongside a mechanical Bengali tiger and the Bangla Queen, which is a four-metre tall peacock structure. The mela also included with nearly 200 stalls serving Bengali spices, food and drinks. It featured many popular artists from Bangladesh and the UK, such as Momtaz, Kajol Dewan and Nukul Kumar. Popular among the younger generation was Mumzy Stranger, who was a leading MC and DJ in the East End of London. Other guest singers included Lucy Rahman, Kala Miah and Mohammed Uzzal miah & others. The stages were hosted by Adil Ray, Shawkat Hashmi, Kan D Man and many more. The main sponsors of the event were BBC Asian Network and Channel S.

== Gallery ==
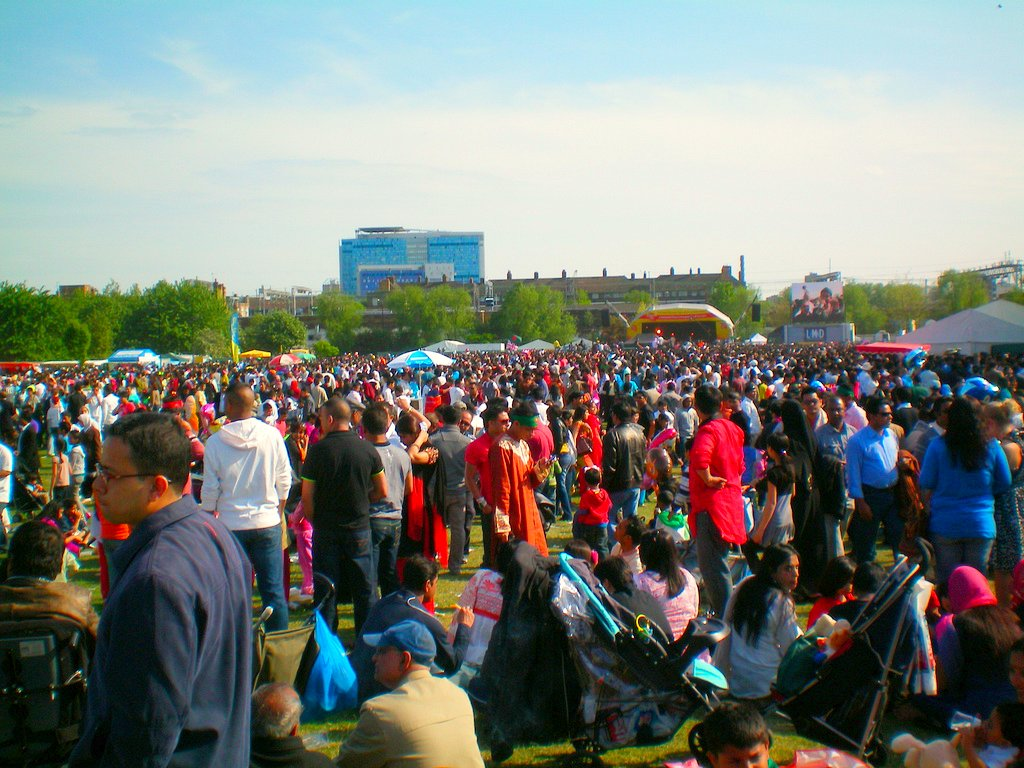

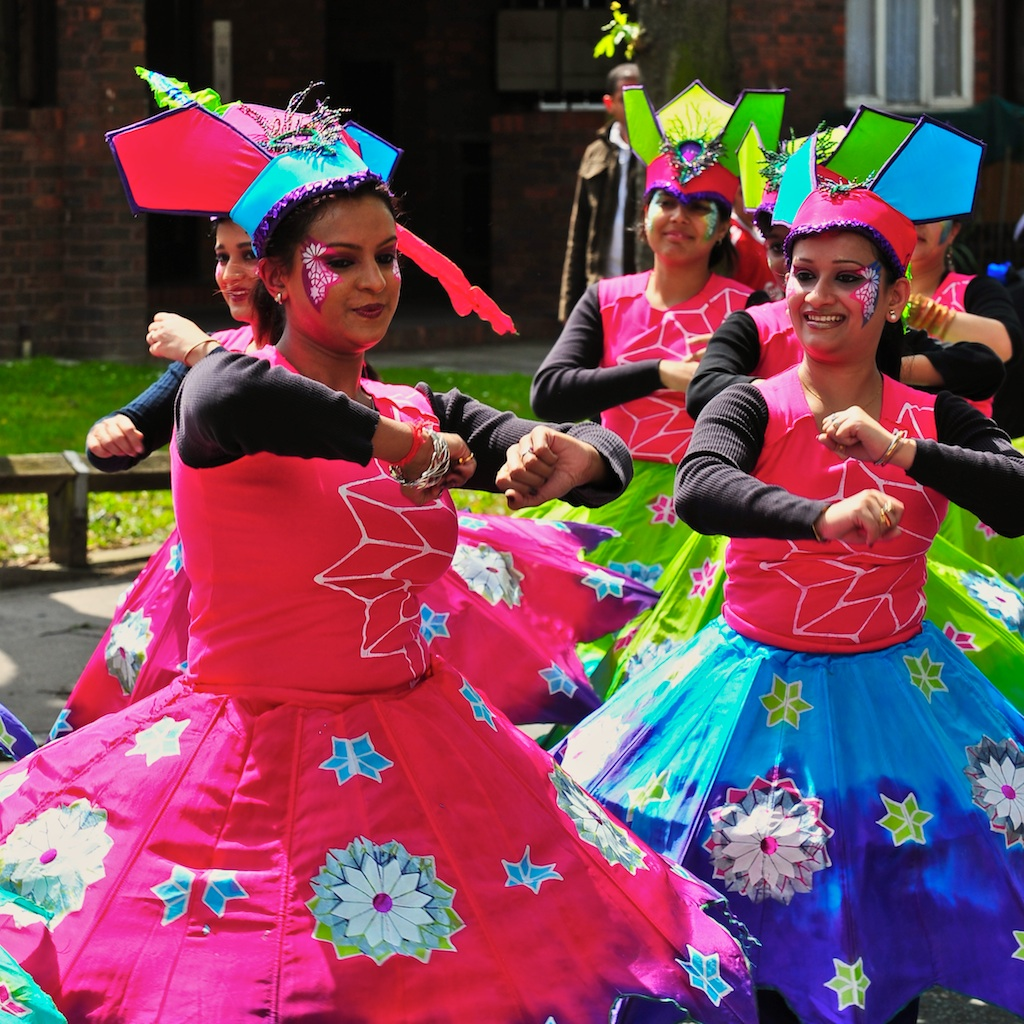

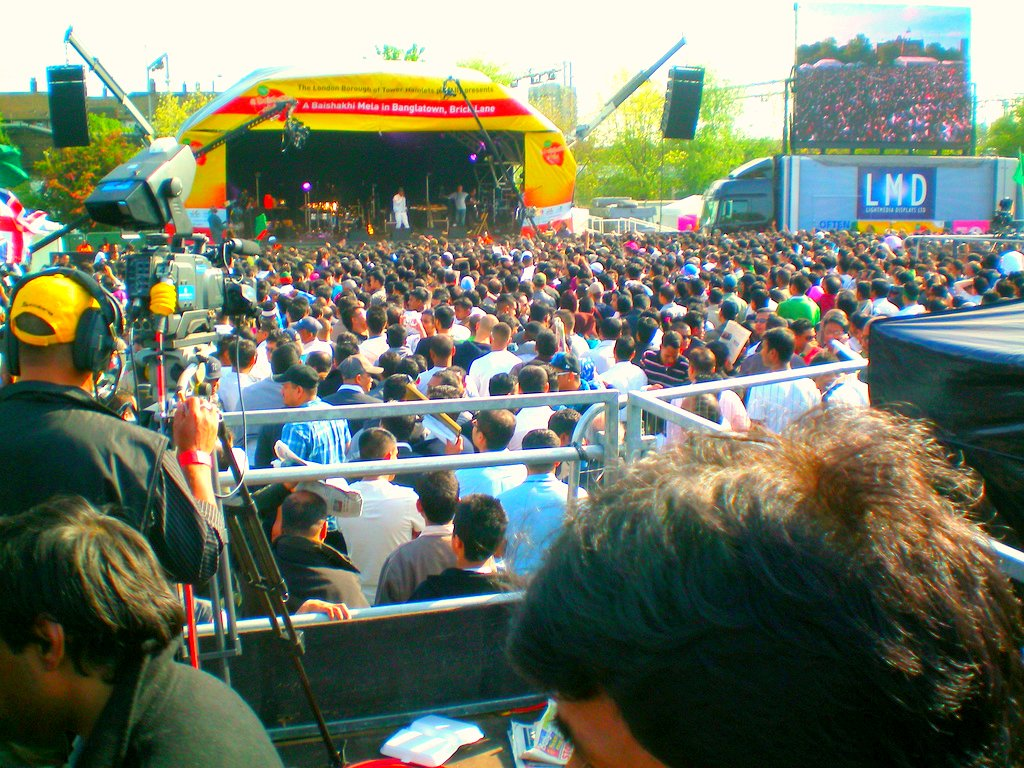

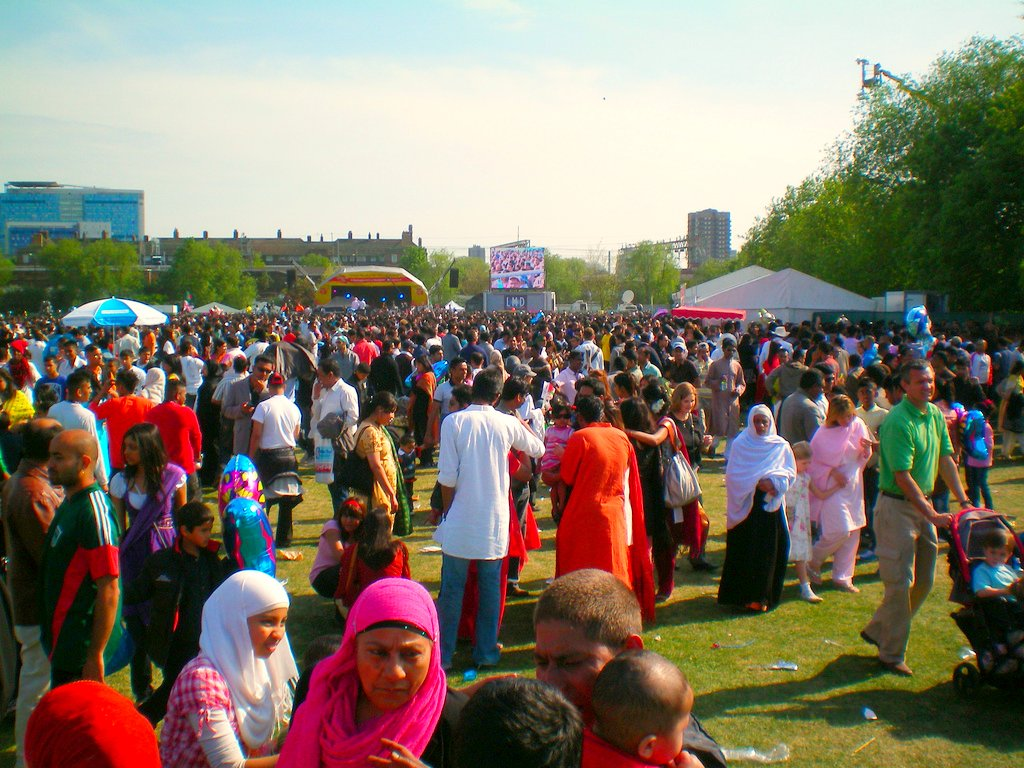

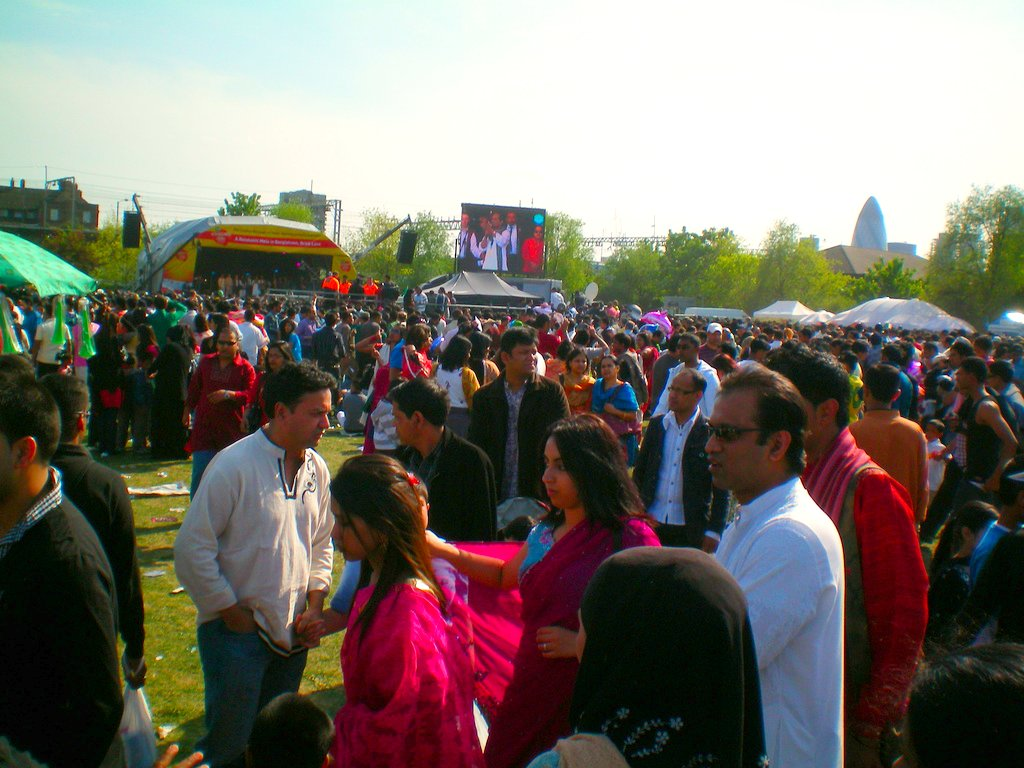

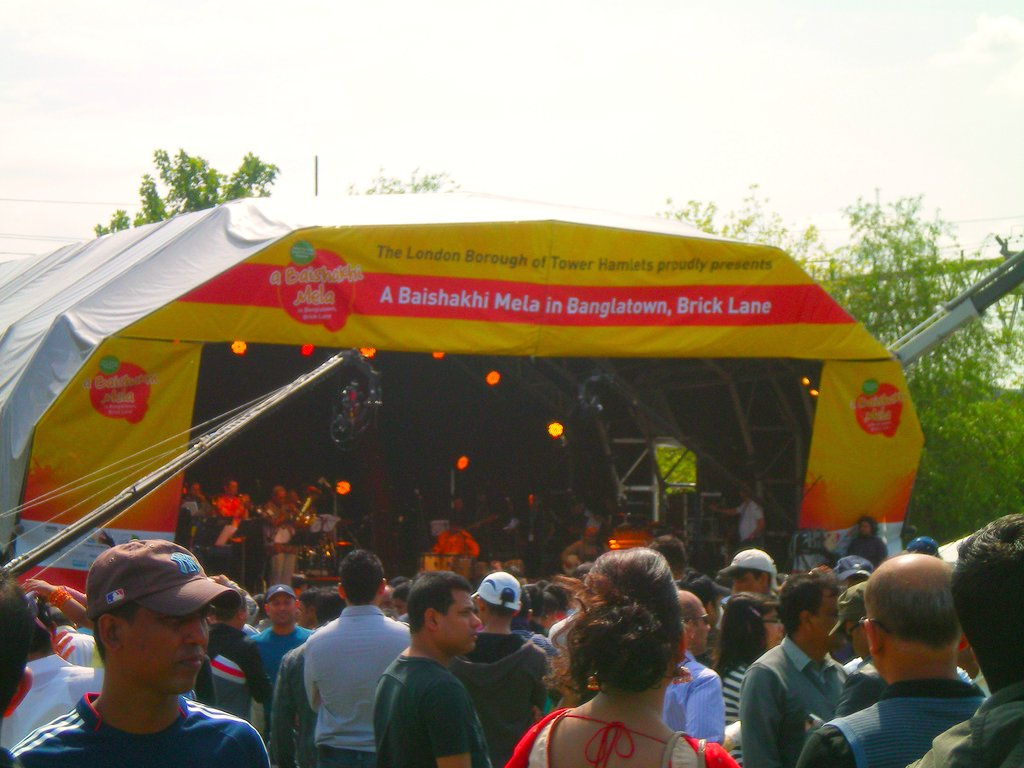

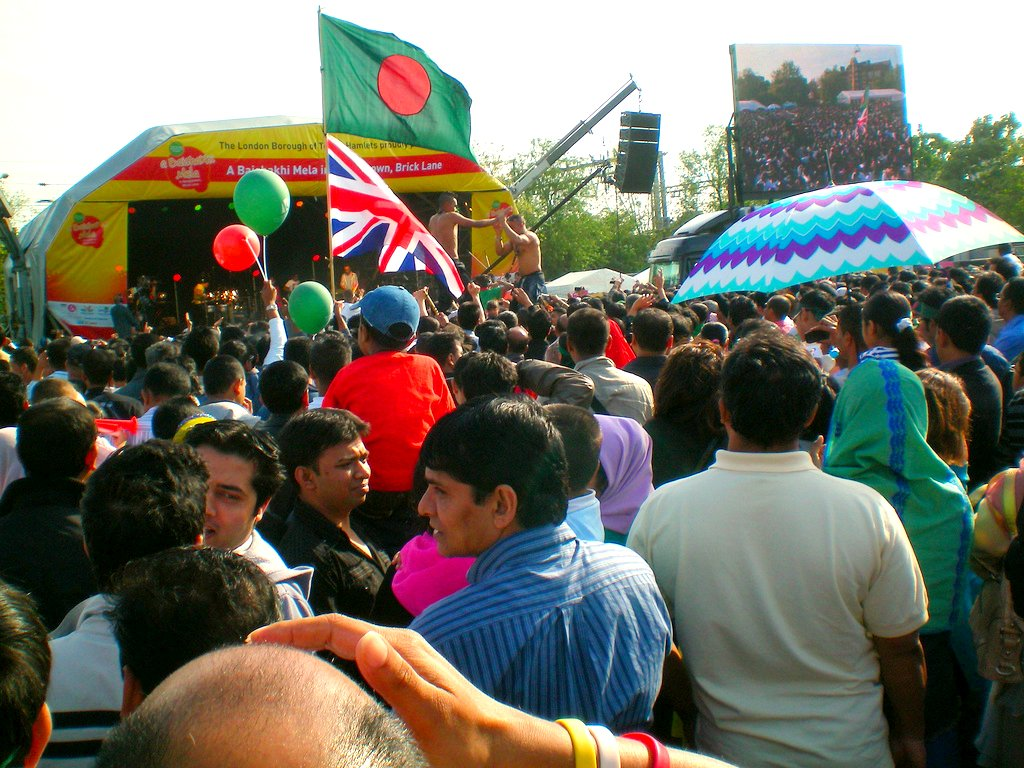

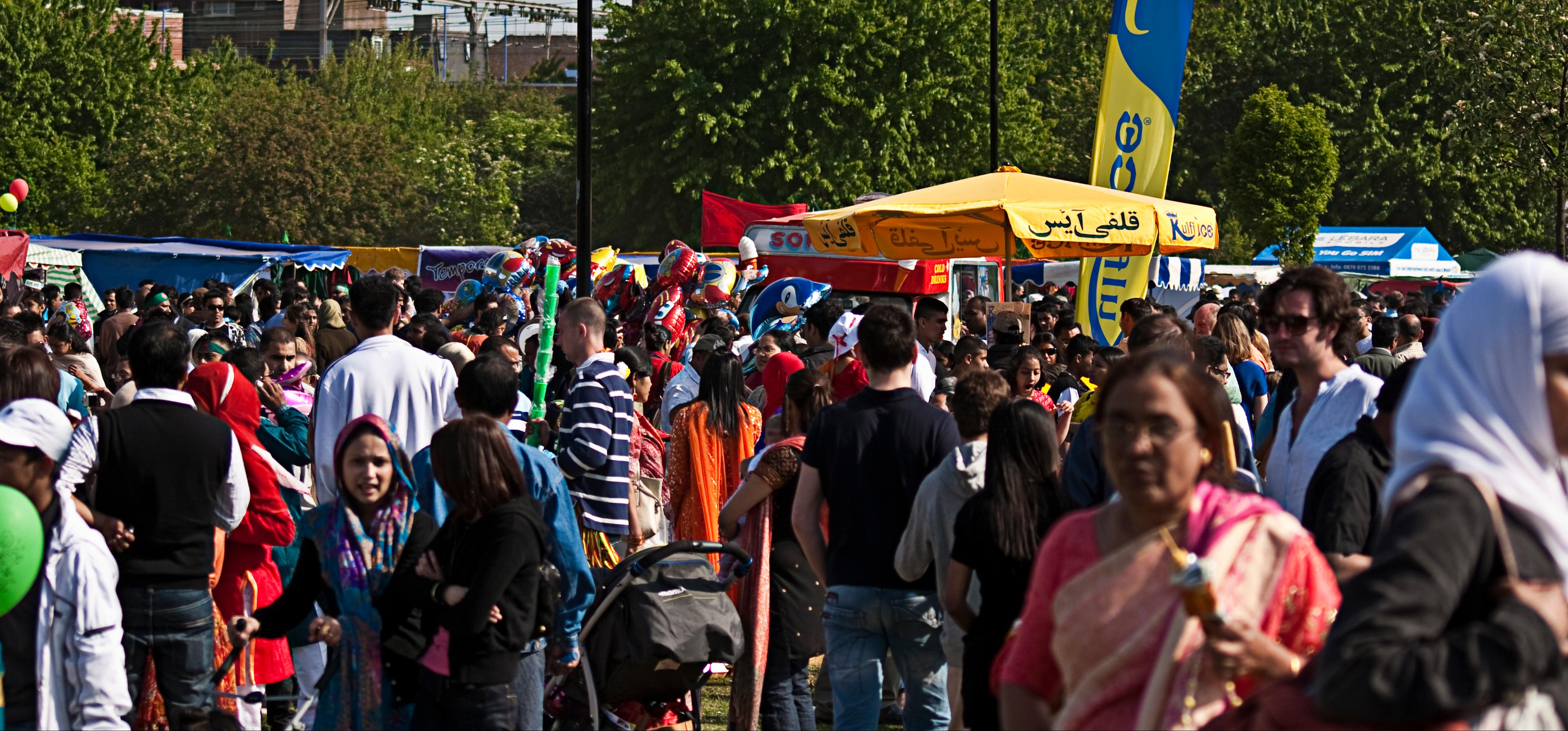

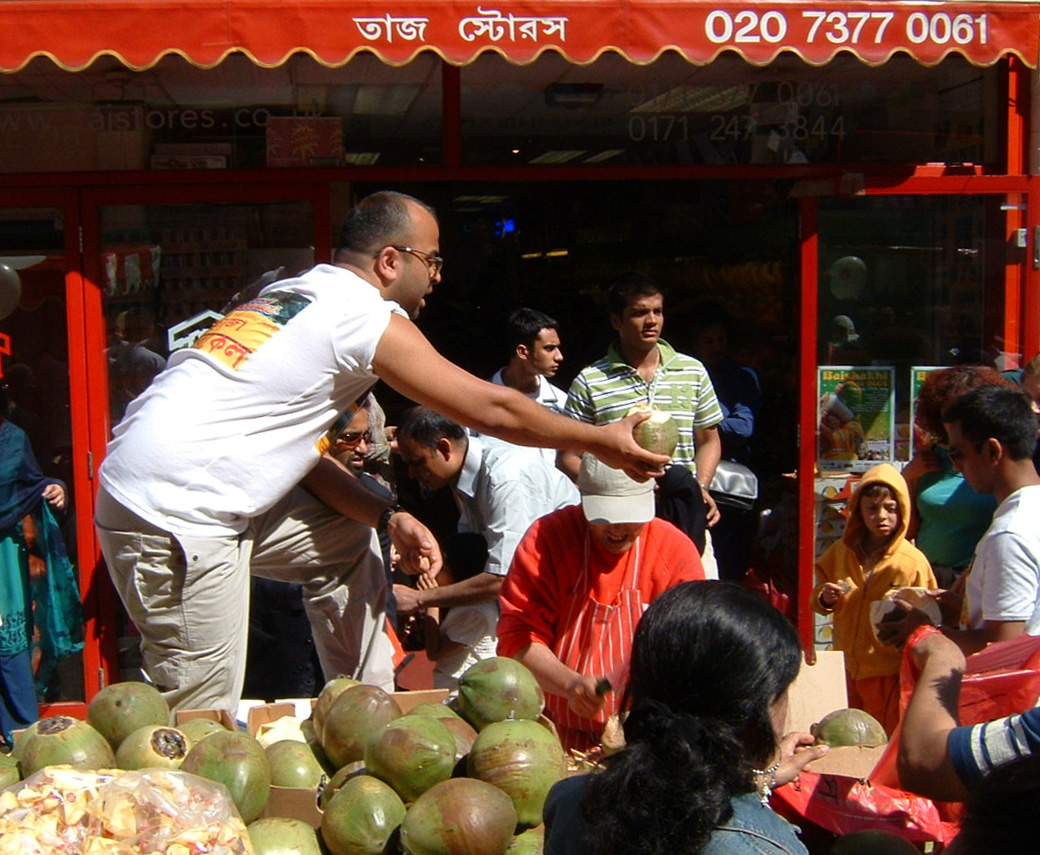

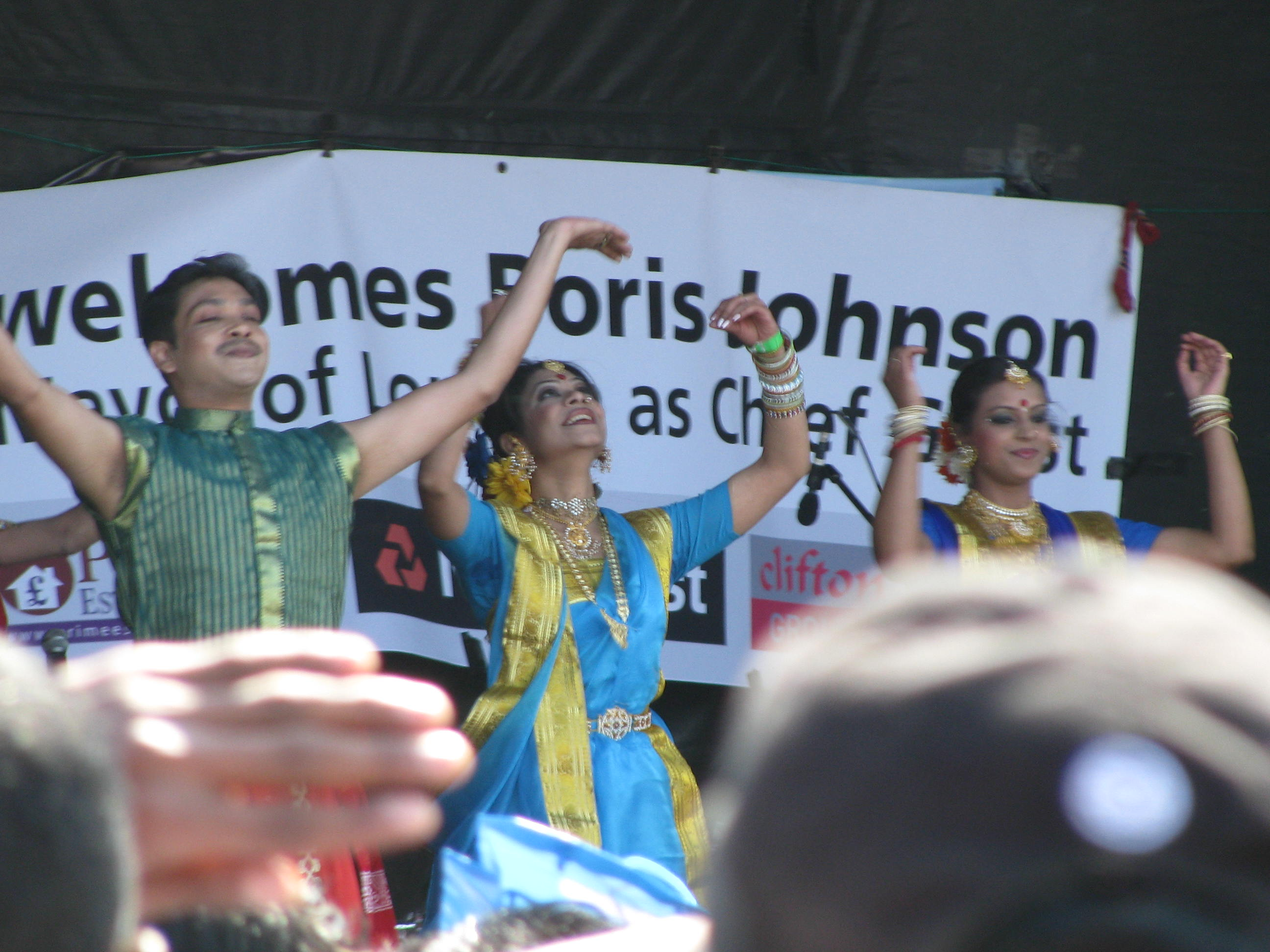

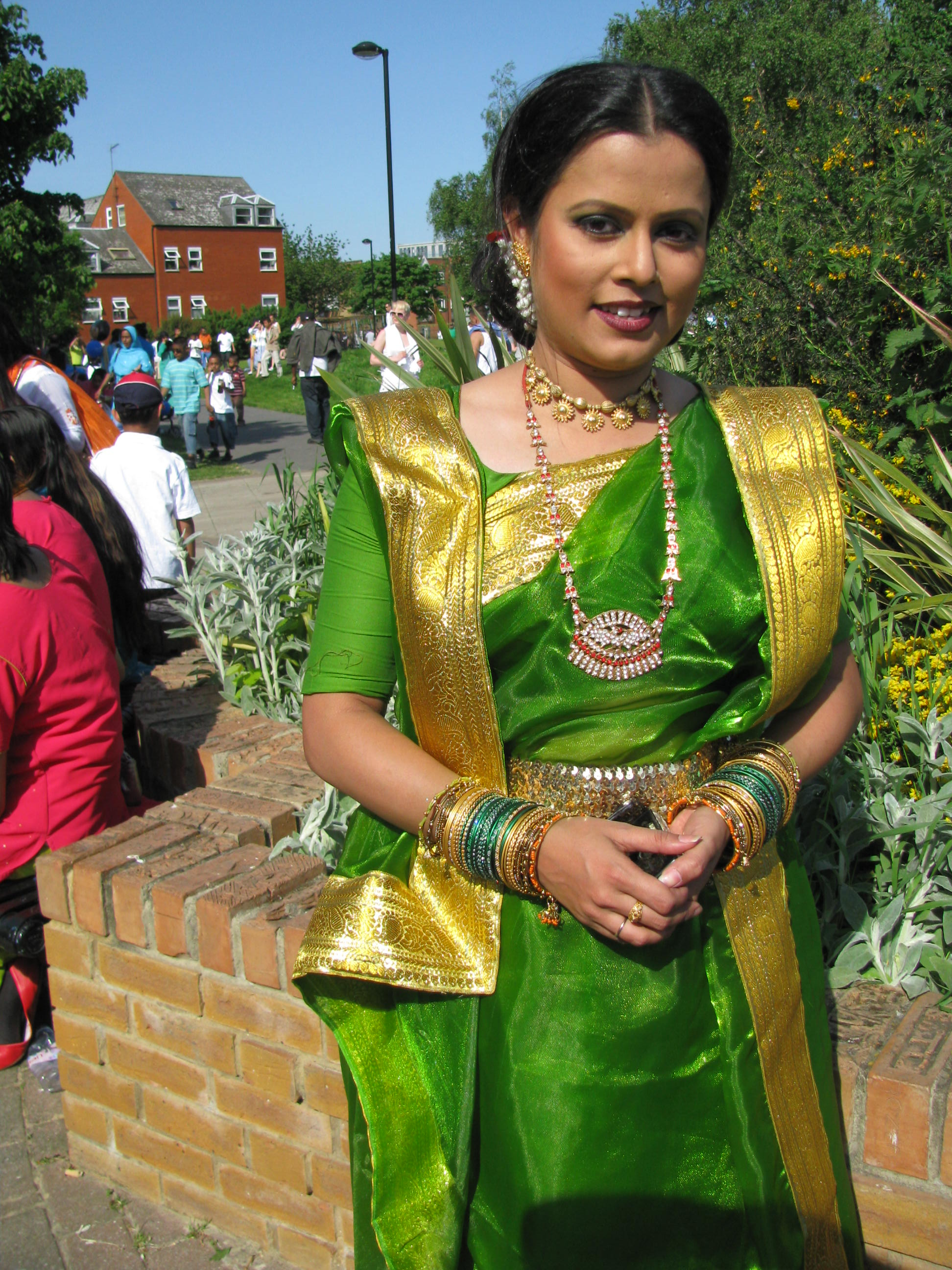

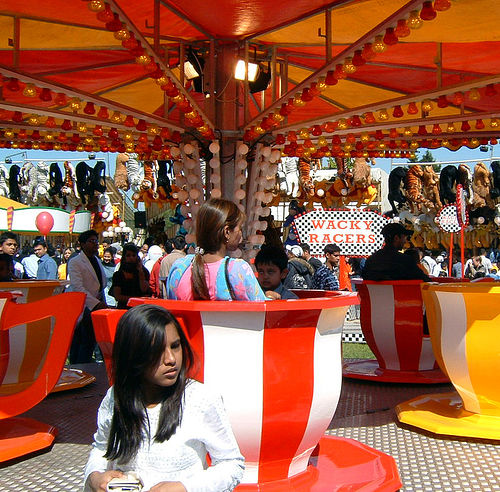

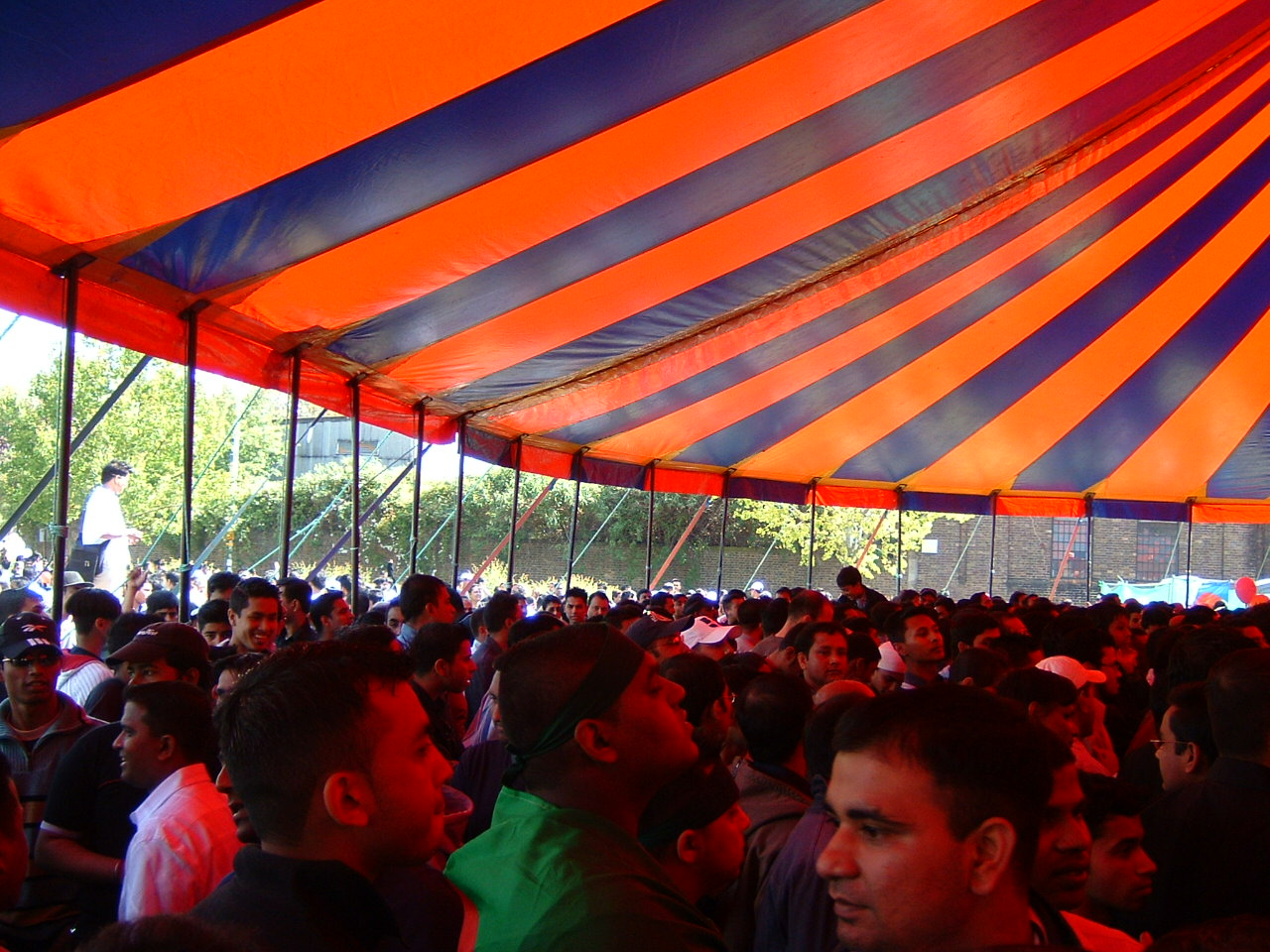

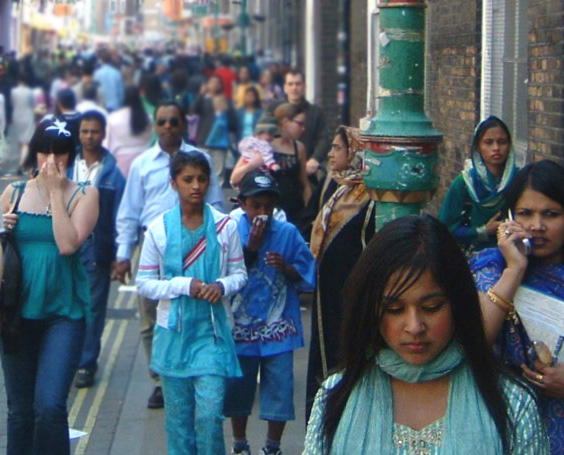

== See also ==
- Pohela Boishakh
- British Bangladeshi
