= Kingston upon Thames Crown Court =

Judicial building in Kingston upon Thames, England

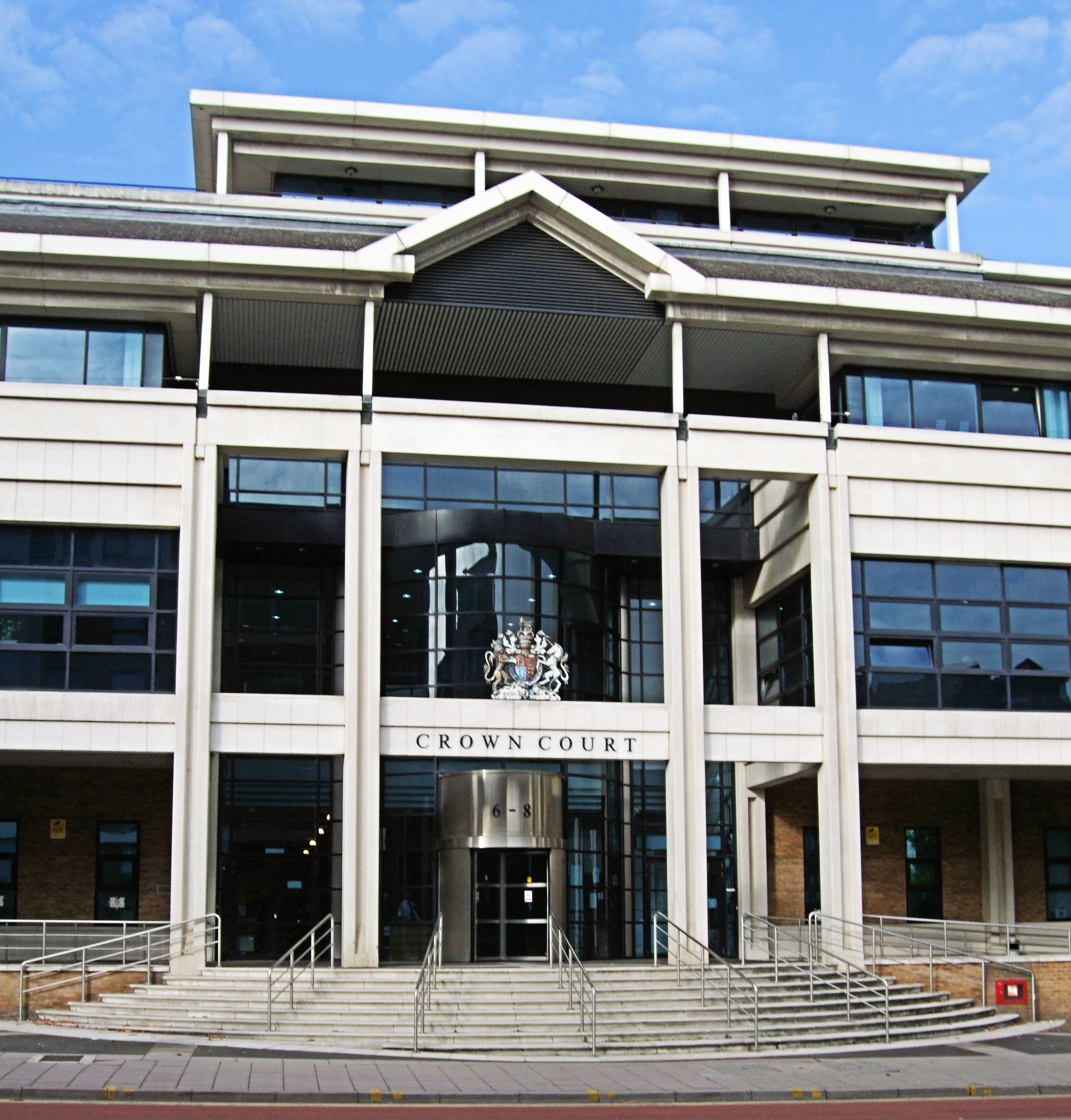
- Kingston upon Thames Crown Court

- Shown in London
- 51.4059°N 0.3046°W
- Location: Penrhyn Road, Kingston upon Thames

History
- Built: 1997

Site notes
- Architectural style: Modernist style

Kingston upon Thames Crown Court is a Crown Court venue which deals with criminal cases at 6–8 Penrhyn Road, Kingston upon Thames, London.

== History ==
Until the late 1990s, Crown Court hearings were held at the Sessions House in Surbiton. However, as the number of criminal cases in southwest London grew, it became necessary to commission a more substantial courthouse for southwest London. The site selected by the Lord Chancellor's Department in The Bittoms had been the site of a Royal palace in the 13th century, but was occupied by the Third Kingston Scout Group by the mid-20th century: it was acquired by Surrey County Council for redevelopment in 1966.

Work on the new building started in February 1994. It was designed and built by a joint venture of HBG and Kyle Stewart in the modernist style in brick and glass with stone dressings at a cost of £18 million and was completed in 1997. The design involved a symmetrical main frontage of eleven bays facing onto Penrhyn Road with the central five bays projected forward. The central bay featured a recessed full-height glass atrium with a semi-circular revolving door on the ground floor, a modern oriel window and a Royal coat of arms on the first floor and a small pediment above. Internally, the principal rooms were the courtrooms which were equipped with curtains to hide the witnesses where necessary.

Notable cases heard at the court include the trial and conviction of six men, including Abu Izzadeen, Sulayman Keeler and Abdul Rahman Saleem, in 2008, on charges of supporting terrorism and the trial and conviction of Kirk Reid, in 2009, on 28 charges of rape and sexual assault.
