= Omar Bakri Muhammad =

Syrian Islamist militant leader and terrorist (born 1958)

- Born: Omar Bakri Fostock; 1958 (age 67–68); Aleppo, Syria
- Education: Al-Azhar University; Umm al-Qura University; Islamic University of Madinah
- Known for: Founder of Al-Muhajiroun
- Movement: Muslim Brotherhood; Hizb ut-Tahrir; Al-Muhajiroun
- Children: 7
- Criminal charges: Terrorism acts (2010)
- Criminal penalty: six years in prison with hard labour
- Criminal status: released in 2023

Omar Bakri Muhammad (Arabic: عمر بكري محمد; born Omar Bakri Fostock; 1958) is a Syrian Islamist militant leader born in Aleppo. He was instrumental in developing Hizb ut-Tahrir in the United Kingdom before leaving the group and heading to another Islamist organisation, Al-Muhajiroun, until its disbandment in 2004.

For several years, Bakri was one of the highest-profile Islamists based in London and was frequently quoted and interviewed in the UK media. In December 2004 he vowed that Muslims would give the West "a 9/11, day after day after day", if Western governments did not change their policies. He has been described as "closely linked to al-Qaeda"—having released prepared statements from Osama bin Laden after the 1998 United States embassy bombings—but also as the "Tottenham Ayatollah", "little more than a loudmouth", and "a figure of fun".

In 2005, following the 7 July 2005 London bombings, The Sunday Times reported that "a dozen members" of his group Al-Muhajiroun "have taken part in suicide bombings or have become close to Al-Qaeda and its support network". Shortly after, Bakri left the UK, where he had sheltered for 20 years, for Lebanon. While there, he was informed by the Home Office that he would not be allowed back into the UK.

Lebanon's state-run National News Agency said on 12 November 2010 that Bakri was among 54 people sentenced by a military court to life in prison with hard labour after being accused of acts of terrorism. After the decision, Bakri told reporters, he would "not spend one day in prison", and said, "I will not hand myself in to any court. I do not believe in the law in Britain as in Lebanon." On 14 November 2010, he was arrested by the Lebanese police and was transferred to Beirut. In October 2014, Bakri was sentenced to six years in prison with hard labour by a Lebanese court. He was released from prison on 29 March 2023.

== Biography ==
=== Early life and education ===
Bakri was born into a wealthy family in the city of Aleppo, Syria, his father was Syrian, while his mother was Turkish. According to Jon Ronson, Bakri claimed that his family had "chauffeurs and servants and palaces in Syria, Turkey and Lebanon".

From the age of five, he was enrolled in the al-Kutaab Islamic boarding schools (a primary school, known as a madrassa, that teaches children how to recite and keep Quran by heart) where he studied the Qur'anic Sciences, Hadith (the sayings of the Prophet of Islam and his Companions), Fiqh (Islamic Jurisprudence), and Seerah (The detailed biography of the Prophet of Islam), etc.

Bakri joined the Syrian branch of the Muslim Brotherhood as a young man. He did not participate in their 1982 Hama revolt against the Syrian Ba'ath Party and the government of Hafez al-Assad.

In 1979, Bakri left Lebanon and moved to Cairo, Egypt, where he studied at Al-Azhar University for six months. He left Al-Azhar before he could get a degree due to disagreements with his teachers.

Throughout his life, Bakri said that he joined many Islamic movements including Muslim Students, Ebad ul-Rahman, al-Ikhwan (al-Tali'ah section), and Hizb ut Tahrir. According to an interview with "Jamestown Special Correspondent" Mahan Abedin, Omar Bakri joined Hizb-ut-Tahrir (HT) in Beirut and maintained contacts with it in Cairo, and started an HT cell in Saudi Arabia.

Bakri said that he studied at the university of Umm al-Qura in Mecca and the Islamic University of Madinah. In 1984, the Saudi Arabian government arrested Bakri in Jeddah, but released him on bail.

=== In United Kingdom ===
Bakri moved to the United Kingdom on 14 January 1986. Later, he travelled to the United States to study English; he returned to the United Kingdom to assume the leadership of Hizb ut-Tahrir and become their spiritual leader. He defended the Muslim faith in public debates against Christian apologists, such as Jay Smith.

In the UK, Bakri worked for ten years helping to build up Hizb ut-Tahrir. According to ex-Hizb ut-Tahrir associate Maajid Nawaz, Bakri encouraged its members to engage in vigilantism against non-Muslims and Muslim women: "We were encouraged by Omar Bakri to operate like street gangs and we did, prowling London, fighting Indian Sikhs in the west and African Christians in the east. We intimidated Muslim women until they wore the hijab and we thought we were invincible."

In 1996, Bakri split with Hizb ut-Tahrir over disagreements on policy, style and methods. He declared that Al-Muhajiroun was an independent organisation and continued as its Amir until 2003.

After the September 11, 2001 attacks in the United States, Bakri praised the attackers as "magnificent." He began to support the theology and philosophy of Al Qaeda. Bakri said that he had become a Salafi Muslim. Media outlets and British Muslims criticised him for his open support for various international jihadist organisations. On 13 September 2001, Bakri told the Daily Mail, "When I first heard about [the September 11, 2001 attacks], there was some initial delight about such an attack. I received a phone call and said, 'Oh, wow, the United States has come under attack.' It was exciting."

According to The Times, Bakri was left alone by British law prior to July 2005 despite actions such as an issuing a fatwa "containing a death threat against President Pervez Musharraf of Pakistan" because:

Bakri, who acts as [al-Muhajiroun's] spiritual leader, insisted that his followers obey a "covenant of security" which, while encouraging terror abroad, forbade them from carrying out attacks in Britain.

But "the authorities may have been lulled into a false sense of security", because the covenant was not permanent. In November 2004 Bakri disbanded Al-Muhajiroun, saying that "all Muslims should unite together against a hostile West". Three months later Bakri said this "covenant of security" was no longer in force, having been violated by the British government. "Experts note", according to The Times, that the July London bombings followed "four months later".

The same article reports "The Sunday Times has identified more than a dozen members of ALM who have taken part in suicide bombings or have become close to Al-Qaeda and its support network", including Mohammed Naeem Noor Khan, "a computer expert now in a Pakistani prison"; Zeeshan Siddiqui, from Hounslow, west London; Bilal Mohammed from Birmingham; and Asif Hanif.

Bakri received an estimated £250,000 in state benefits since claiming asylum in Britain in 1986. Since he left the country in 2005, he has been banned from entering Britain.

==== Students ====
His main students were Khalid Kelly, Anjem Choudary, Sulayman Keeler, Abu Izzadeen and Abu Uzair, a trained civil engineer who leads or led the Savior Sect.

=== Return to the Middle East ===
On 6 August 2005, Bakri left the United Kingdom following stories that the UK Government were planning to investigate certain Muslim clerics under little-used treason laws. He was banned from returning by British Home Secretary Charles Clarke stating that Bakri's presence in Britain was "not conducive to the public good". He subsequently took up residence in Lebanon. During the 2006 Lebanon War, he tried to flee Lebanon on a Royal Navy vessel evacuating British citizens; he was turned away by the Royal Navy.

In 2005, Bakri made a televised appeal to the captors of Norman Kember, a hostage in Iraq. After his speech Bakri said, "I appeal myself to them, you see, that to show guidance and mercy to any victim in their hand. But after that I can't myself guarantee anything except to tell you these people mean business."

Bakri has reaffirmed the fatwa on Salman Rushdie, saying from Lebanon, "Rushdie will continue living his life in hiding. Any fatwa will stand until it is fulfilled. He is always going to be worried about a Muslim reaching him."

During an online question-and-answer session, a Vigil member asked Bakri if Dublin Airport should be a terrorist target because U.S. troops transit there on the way to Iraq. Bakri told the member to "hit the target and hit it very hard. That issue should be understood. Your situation there is quite difficult, therefore the answer lies in your question." He said the 7/7 London bombers were in "paradise".

On 27 July 2007, a special edition of Newsnight entitled 'Battle for Islam' was broadcast, in which Gavin Esler presented on the battle for the heart and soul of Islam. Omar Bakri featured live from Lebanon alongside Reza Aslan in Los Angeles, and Benazir Bhutto in the studio in London with Maryam Namazie. Currently Bakri reportedly heads the Atibaa' Ahlus Sunnah wal Jamaah movement.

=== Family ===
Bakri is, or was, married to Hanah and has seven children. According to ex-Hizb ut-Tahrir member Maajid Nawaz, Bakhri's daughter, Yasmin Fostok, "grew so disillusioned with her father's rhetoric that in one monumental act of defiance she left home and became a stripper".

On 30 December 2015, his son, Bilal, was killed while fighting for ISIS in Iraq.

== Alleged ties to terrorism ==
British newspapers have called him the "Tottenham Ayatollah", despite him identifying as Salafi and the title "ayatollah" being a Shia epithet. Former Conservative MP Rupert Allason described him as a "terrorist who believes in planting bombs and blowing up women and children in Israel". Roland Jacquard, a French expert on Islamic terrorism, said that "every al-Qaeda operative recently arrested or identified in Europe had come into contact with Bakri at some time or other".

=== Internet broadcasts ===
In January 2005, The Times monitored live, 90-minute internet lectures from Bakri in a chatroom in which he told listeners, "I believe the whole of Britain has become Dar al-Harb (land of war). The kuffar (non-believer) has no sanctity for their own life or property." He said Muslims should join the jihad "wherever you are" and told a woman she was allowed to do a suicide bombing. In another broadcast he said, "Al-Qaeda and all its branches and organizations of the world, that is the victorious group and they have the emir and you are obliged to join. There is no need ... to mess about." Two days later, in another broadcast, he said that dead mujaheedin "are calling you and shouting to you from far distant places: al jihad, al jihad. They say to you my dear Muslim brothers, 'Where is your weapon, where is your weapon?' Come on to the jihad."

Andrew Dismore, a Labour MP, claimed that "With these words he may well be committing offences under the Terrorism Act and other legislation. I will be raising this immediately with the Home Secretary and the Metropolitan Police."

==== Comments on terrorist attacks ====
Commenting on 11 September 2001 attacks, The Times claims he said on his website, "I am very happy today. As much as I regret the innocent people who passed away, with the USA you must pay." The Montreal Gazette however claims that he said in an interview, "If Islamists did it—and most likely it is Islamists, because of the nature of what happened—then they have fully misunderstood the teachings of Islam. ... Even the most radical of us have condemned this. I am always considered to be a radical in the Islamic world and even I condemn it." Bakri, discussing the 2004 Madrid train bombings, is alleged by The Times to have said, "What happened in Madrid is all revenge. Eye for eye, tooth for tooth, life for life."

=== Financing of "mujahideen" ===
On 24 October 2006 British security officials arrested Omar Bakri's son, Abdul Rahman Fostok, at Heathrow Airport, and seized £13,000 that he intended to deliver to Bakri in Lebanon. The money was held under the Proceeds of Crime Act, pending an investigation, but Fostok was allowed to board his flight. Responding to this, Bakri said,

I am not expecting any problem with the money but if I do not get it there will be trouble. I will take action because it is my property. God says you must do all in your power to get something back if it is taken from you – even if it costs you your life. They will be playing with fire.

=== Kidnapping plot ===
On 31 January 2007 British police arrested nine suspected terrorists who were allegedly planning to kidnap, torture, and behead a British Muslim in the army, all of which would be videotaped and later broadcast on the internet. The soldier had served in the War in Afghanistan, but had returned home to Britain on temporary leave. On 4 February secret recordings of Bakri Muhammad emerged in which he calls for the attack. Bakri told listeners,

When you meet [Infidels], slice their own necks. And when you make the blood spill all over, and the enemy becomes so tired, now start to take from them prisoners. Then free them or exchange them until the war is finished. Verily they remind the sunnah of removing the head of the enemy. They remind the sunnah of slaughtering the enemy. They remind the sunnah of how to strike the neck of the enemy. We saw him in his brother's house. They removed the head of the enemy. Use the sword and remove the head of the enemy.

He previously called for a kidnapping-terrorist attack in 2005. In another incident he said he hoped someone would "capture British Muslims who are in the Army over there". He has said that a Beslan-style attack is alright if children are not deliberately killed.

=== Them: Adventures With Extremists ===
British journalist Jon Ronson's Them: Adventures With Extremists, a documentary (The Tottenham Ayatollah, directed by Saul Dibb) and book published in 2001, depicts Ronson and Dibb's interactions with Bakri. Ronson depicts Bakri as a charismatic orator who tells a cheering crowd of 5000 that "he will not rest" until he sees "the Black Flag of Islam flying over Downing Street", and calls for the stoning of fornicators and closing of pubs. He tells Ronson, "I cannot take a day off, an hour off, even a minute off. I will take time off when I am with Allah, when I die in the battlefield and become a martyr." But he also describes Bakri as living in a semi-detached council house, enjoying watching a video of Disney's The Lion King, being unable to hold a fish caught on a fishing line, and calling himself "actually very nice".

In a phone call after the 9/11 attack on the evening of his arrest and release without charge, Ronson reports Bakri as telling him,

Oh Jon, I need you more than ever now. You know I am harmless, don't you? You know I am just a clown. You know I am laughable, don't you? ... Why don't people believe you when you tell them that I am just a harmless clown?

Ronson replied that he had never thought that.

=== Arrests and conviction in Lebanon ===
Future Television interviewed Bakri on 11 August 2005. Bakri said he did not have ties to Al Qaeda, calling it a "media creation" and said he did not intend to return to Britain. During the interview, Bakri said, "I left Britain on my own accord though I have not been accused of anything there or in Lebanon ... but the London attacks are the reason I have returned". According to media reports, Lebanese police arrested Bakri as soon as he left the building after the interview. Police later said the arrest was "a routine arrest to determine his reasons and if his residency in Lebanon is legitimate". Lebanese Information Minister Ghazi Aridi later said Bakri was arrested as a "precautionary measure". British Ambassador to Lebanon James Watt said, "We made no request for his arrest, nor for his extradition. As far as I am concerned, this is a very simple story – it is a Lebanese citizen who returned to Lebanon and has been arrested by the Lebanese police. We have nothing to do with it and it's not in our place to comment on what has happened."

In mid-November 2010, Bakri was sentenced to life in prison in Lebanon in a terrorism case that he claimed to know nothing about, but was subsequently released on bail when witnesses who testified against him withdrew their testimony.

After his release he was reported to be living in Tripoli. In April 2014, his home was raided by Lebanese security forces because of his alleged involvement in fighting between the area's Alawite community and local Sunnis. He fled the city and the Lebanese authorities announced he was wanted for "endangering national security". In May 2014 he was arrested in the city of Aley and, in a press conference, the Lebanese Interior Minister, Nouhad Machnouk, alleged that Bakri "has contributed in every aspect in supporting terrorism".

In October 2014, Bakri was sentenced to six years in prison with hard labour by a Lebanese court for founding a Lebanese affiliate of the Al-Qaeda linked Syrian terrorist group Al-Nusra Front, and of building a training camp for Nusra Front fighters in Lebanon. The following year, two of Bakri's sons were killed fighting in the ranks of rival extremist group the Islamic State. The first, Muhammad, was killed in Aleppo, Syria, and the second, Bilal, in Salah al-Din province in Iraq in December 2015.

== Publications ==
The author of "many booklets and articles", some of his publications include:

- Essential Fiqh, London : Islamic Book Company, 1996.
- The role of the mosque, London : Islamic Book Company, 1996.
- The political struggle for Islam, London : Al-Khilafah Publications, 1998.
- Al-Fareed Fee Mukhtasar Al-Tawheed: A Summary of the Unique Tawheed, London : Al-Muhajiroun Publications, 2003.

== See also ==
- Abu Hamza al-Masri
- Abdullah el-Faisal
- Yassir al-Sirri
- Abu Qatada
- Mohammad al-Massari
- Abdul Waheed Majeed

== Bibliography ==
- Ronson, Jon (2002), Them: Adventures With Extremists, Simon and Schuster, ISBN 978-0-7432-2707-0
- al-Ashanti, AbdulHaq and as-Salafi, Abu Ameenah AbdurRahman. (2009) A Critical Study of the Multiple Identities and Disguises of 'al-Muhajiroun': Exposing the Antics of the Cult Followers of Omar Bakri Muhammad Fustuq. London: Jamiah Media, 2009 ISBN 978-0-9551099-4-2
