= Croydon Law Courts =

Judicial building in Croydon, England

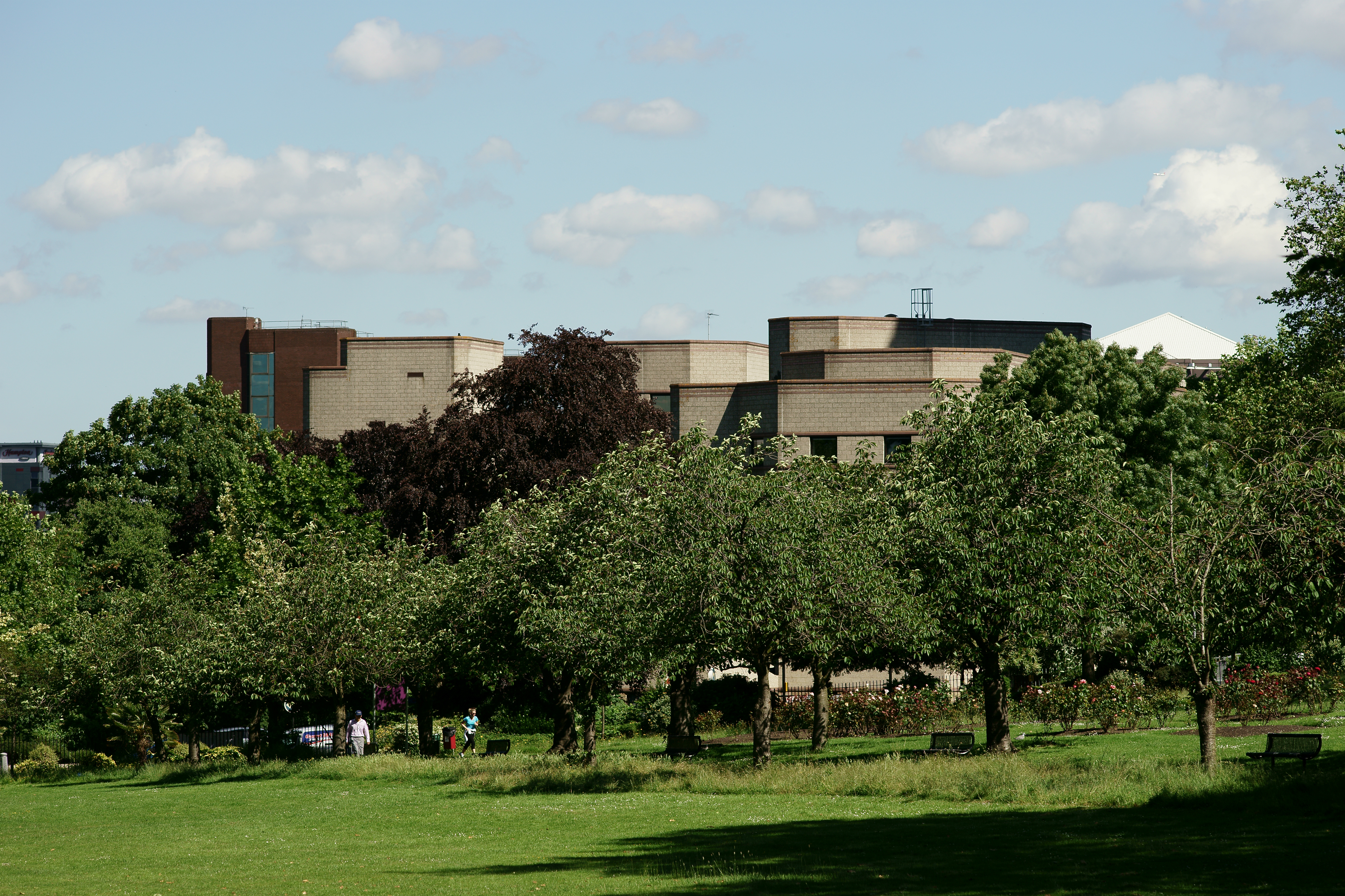
- Croydon Law Courts in Altyre Road seen from Park Hill

- Shown in London
- 51.3729°N 0.0922°W
- Location: Altyre Road, Croydon

History
- Built: 1991

Site notes
- Architect: Property Services Agency
- Architectural style: Modernist style

Croydon Law Courts is a Crown Court venue, which deals with criminal cases, and a County Court venue, which deals with civil cases, in Altyre Road, Croydon, London. There is also an older magistrates' courts building on an adjacent site in Barclay Road.

== History ==
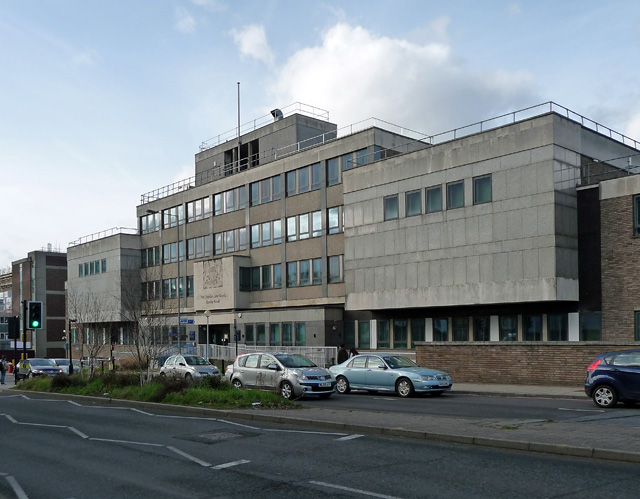
The courthouse in Barclay Road

During the 19th century and for much of the 20th century, the Surrey county assizes were held in Croydon Town Hall. However, in the 1960s, there was considerable public pressure for the provision of dedicated court facilities in Croydon. In response the Lord Chancellor's Department commissioned a combined courts centre in Barclay Road: the site chosen was open land on the north side of Barclay Road in an area known as Fair Field, which had been an area used for hosting fairs and outside performances in the 19th century.

The foundation stone for the new building in Barclay Road was laid by the Lord Chancellor, Lord Gardiner, on 26 September 1966. It was designed by Robert Atkinson & Partners in the modernist style, built in concrete and glass and was completed in 1968.

The design involved a symmetrical main frontage in three sections facing onto Barclay Road. The central section was formed by four storeys of alternating bands of glass and concrete, with a large concrete panel, which was decorated with a Royal coat of arms, cantilevered out over the entrance at first floor level. The side sections, which were projected forward, featured large concrete walls which were cantilevered out over the pavement at the first and second floor levels. There was considerable debate at the time, initiated by the Lord Chancellor, Lord Gardiner, as to whether to use flip-up seating, benches or swivel chairs in the courtooms.

As the number of court cases in Croydon grew, it became necessary to commission more courtroom space: the site selected for the new courthouse was on an adjacent site, on the west side of Altyre Road, just to the east of the existing law courts and separated only by the Thameslink railway line. The new building was designed by the Property Services Agency in the modernist style, built in buff stone at a cost of £15.2 million, and was completed in 1991. The design involved an asymmetrical main frontage in three sections facing onto Altyre Road. The central section was recessed and was connected to the left hand section by a canted wall, which featured a glass entrance with a stone canopy and, to its left, a polygon-shaped tower with a Royal coat of arms at the top. The right hand section also featured a tower. The building was fenestrated by small square casement windows on the first and second floors and by a continuous row of casement windows on the third floor. The complex was laid out to accommodate eleven courtrooms. The crown court and the county court moved to the new building in Altyre Road, allowing the Barclay Road building to be dedicated for use by the magistrates' courts.

Notable cases have included the trial and conviction of the taxi driver, John Worboys, in March 2009, for the rape and assault of twelve female passengers in the back of his taxi cab. Following the 2011 England riots, the Ministry of Justice experimented with the use of shift-working in the Croydon Law Courts to clear the backlog of court cases.
