= Hassan Butt =

British-Pakistani activist

- Born: 1980 (age 45–46)
- Occupation: British Pakistani
- Known for: Former spokesman of the radical Islamic group al-Muhajiroun

Hassan Butt (Urdu: حسن بٹ) (born 1980) is a British Pakistani former spokesman of the radical Islamic group al-Muhajiroun who now calls on Muslims to "renounce terror".

Butt has claimed that before renouncing terror he sent arms to the Taliban, organised training for 200 British Muslims to fight in Jihad, collected money for terrorism, incited others to terrorism, encouraged attacks on political and military targets in the UK and associated with the 7/7 bombers.

On 9 May 2008, British anti-terror police arrested Butt for questioning just as he was about to board a flight to Lahore, Pakistan; he was released after twelve days. Manchester Police subsequently released extracts from their interviews with Butt in which he stated that "I've never met Osama bin Laden. I've never met anyone from Al-Qaeda, or anyone who claimed to be from Al-Qaeda at all in my entire life", and that he had stabbed himself "as part of the whole scam."

== Personal life, education, and career ==
Hassan Butt was born in Luton to Kashmiri parents, who later moved to Manchester. There Butt attended Prestwich High School, where he claims to have been forced out for his 'Islamic activities’. He finished at Abraham Moss High School, then attended Bury College and the University of Wolverhampton, which also expelled him.

At the age of 20, he moved to Pakistan and gained notoriety in 2002 when he claimed that he had recruited 200 British volunteers to fight for the Taliban who would return to the UK and launch terror attacks.

On his return from Pakistan, he approached the Mirror newspaper attempting to sell his story for £100,000. Following this attempt, a spokesman for the Muslim Council of Great Britain said: "The very wild claims that Butt has made from Lahore show him for what he is: a clown and someone who wants to make himself important."

== Early views ==
In an interview with Prospect magazine, Butt said that he would be honoured to be called a terrorist, "I would agree to being called a radical and one day I may even be called a terrorist, if Allah permits me. That is something it would be an honour to be called."

Advocating the superiority of Islam, Butt has said that "Islam is a way of life, a way of life superior to communism and capitalism. Christianity is a mere religion and can’t cater for people’s way of life, but Islam can. With the fall of the Soviet Union, people started turning to Islam as a way of life, whereas America wanted to spread capitalism across the world. That's why Islam became the enemy."

Arguing for the necessity for Muslims to live under Sharia law, Butt said that, "Every Muslim must work for the Shari’a to be implemented as a political way of life. They can do that physically, by involving themselves in revolutionary coups, or through political means. As long as they don't attack or compromise other Muslims who are doing something different from them, I have no problem with any of these ways of establishing the Shari’a."

Butt has argued that Muslims in Britain should have no allegiance to Britain, saying, "I feel absolutely nothing for this country. I have no problem with the British people...but if someone attacks them, I have no problem with that either."

== Later views ==
In 2007, Butt argued that, "The fact is that Muslims in Britain are citizens of this country. We are no longer migrants in a Land of Unbelief. For my generation, we were born here, raised here, schooled here, we work here and we'll stay here. But more than that, on a historically unprecedented scale, Muslims in Britain have been allowed to assert their religious identity through clothing, the construction of mosques, the building of cemeteries and equal rights in law."

Butt warned that thousands of young Muslims were preparing to unleash fresh "terror atrocities" on Britain's streets. In May 2007, Butt told the News of the World that, "It's sad but we WILL have more atrocities like 7/7 because there are tens of thousands of Muslims who still support violence." Following the 2007 Glasgow International Airport attack, Butt appeared on Newsnight where he alleged that "most Muslims" believed that terrorist activity attracts divine pleasure and admission to paradise and that "anything that is not an Islamic way of life" is a legitimate target for attack.

Butt called on the West to take on radicals and violent extremists, arguing that, "Muslim scholars must go back to the books and come forward with a refashioned set of rules and a revised understanding of the rights and responsibilities of Muslims whose homes and souls are firmly planted in what I'd like to term the Land of co-existence."

== Criticisms ==
British Muslim activist Anas Altikriti, has strongly criticised Butt, arguing that, "Now that he has changed sides, rather than see the error in the methodology and ideology to which he once subscribed and which he peddled for years, he has adopted the posture of extremist once again - and is hurling abuse once more, albeit from the opposite side." Altikriti concludes that "The call to change the face of Islam, attacking Islamic doctrine through the copy-and-paste methodology that falsely makes the Qur'an seem like a book of evil, is unjust and disingenuous."

There has also been criticism from the Assistant Secretary General of the Muslim Council of Britain, Inayat Bunglawala, who has argued that Butt is wrong to argue that "we [Britain] do not need to revisit some of our own murderous actions overseas and examine whether they have contributed to the spread of violent extremism."

The Muslim activist Faisal Haque asked why Butt has not been arrested and suggested that Butt "may have been working for the security service". Butt has denied these charges saying he would inform the police if he would be aware of an impending terror attack, but that he was not an informer.

In May 2008, Channel 4 News in the UK reported that Greater Manchester Police had released transcripts from their interviews with Hassan Butt. In the extracts he said he had fabricated many of his previous claims, that he had never met Osama bin Laden and that he had stabbed himself in the arm rather than having been attacked by extremists as he had previously claimed.

== See also ==
- Ed Husain
- Daveed Gartenstein-Ross
- Islamism
- Extremism
- Omar Bakri Muhammad
