= Andrew Ibrahim =

British terrorist

- Born: 25 January 1989 (age 37); Bristol, England
- Other name: Isa Ibrahim
- Occupation: Student
- Convictions: Making explosives with intent Preparing terrorist acts Making an explosive substance
- Penalty: Indeterminate prison sentence Minimum 10 years

Andrew Philip Michael Ibrahim (born 25 January 1989) is a British Muslim convert, also known as Isa Ibrahim after his conversion to Islam. Ibrahim was arrested by the Avon and Somerset Police on suspicion of terrorism, and on 17 July 2009 convicted of preparing terrorist acts.

== Early life ==
Ibrahim was born to a Coptic Christian Egyptian father and an English mother, Vicky. He is the son of an NHS consultant pathologist.

== Education ==
Ibrahim attended four schools: Colston's School and Queen Elizabeth's Hospital in Bristol, Downside School in Somerset, and Bristol Cathedral School. At the time of his arrest he was a student at City of Bristol College.

== Arrest ==
Ibrahim was arrested after inquiries prompted by a tip-off from within the city's Muslim community.

After his arrest police evacuated residents in Comb Paddock, Westbury-on-Trym, a Bristol suburb, whilst soldiers from the Royal Logistic Corps carried out controlled explosions at his home/flat. The police also sealed off and searched nearby woodland.

== Prosecution ==
On 30 April 2008 Ibrahim was charged with terrorist offences. They were: 1. possession of an explosive substance 2. intent to commit terrorism and 3. possession of articles for terrorist purposes.

He was accused of possessing the explosive substance hexamethylene triperoxide diamine, also known as HMTD, an organic chemical compound. He was also accused of possessing two home-made vests, ball bearings, air gun pellets, nails and screws, wired circuitry, batteries and electric bulb filaments.

On 30 April 2008 Ibrahim appeared at the City of Westminster Magistrates' Court. After a short hearing he was remanded in custody until 23 May. He was accused of having an explosive substance with intent and also charged with intending to commit a terrorist act by intending to construct and detonate an improvised explosive device.

On 17 July 2009 at Winchester Crown Court Ibrahim was given an indeterminate sentence, with a minimum of ten years in jail.
