= Abu Uzair =

Abu Uzair is a Muslim teacher and Islamist activist in the United Kingdom. He served as the leader of the Saved Sect, an organisation that the British government has designated and banned as a terrorist. Uzair, formerly a member of Al-Muhajiroun, is a Pakistani-Briton. He preached at Finsbury Park Mosque.

== Controversial remarks ==
In 2005, he praised the September 11, 2001 attacks as "magnificent" and said that if he knew about plans to carry out a suicide attack, he would not alert the police.

=== Time magazine interview ===
Uzair grew up in a secular household. His religious views became more conservative when he attended a university in Britain. He told Time magazine, "I wanted some inner discipline. Since I have come to Islam, I have a lot of tranquillity." Speaking on terrorism, "The majority of Muslims in the U.K. are frustrated, but they cannot speak. They will not condone the London bombings, but inside, they believe that Britain had it coming. Muslims are being killed all over the world through the foreign policy of the U.K. and U.S. Many feel they cannot sit around and do nothing about it. What is the difference between a suicide bomber and a B-52? I really feel that war has been declared on Islam."

=== BBC News interview ===
In an interview with BBC Newsnight, Uzair said, "We don't live in peace with you any more. The banner has been risen for jihad inside the UK, which means it's allowed for the bombers to attack ... I would never go to the police because I believe that spying on Muslims is never allowed. I am a British citizen but I am a Muslim first, a Muslim second and a Muslim last. Even if I am British, I don't follow the values of the UK - I follow the values of Islam." Uzair said the British government had broken the "covenant of security" with British Muslims.
