= Murder of Lee Rigby =

2013 murder of a British soldier

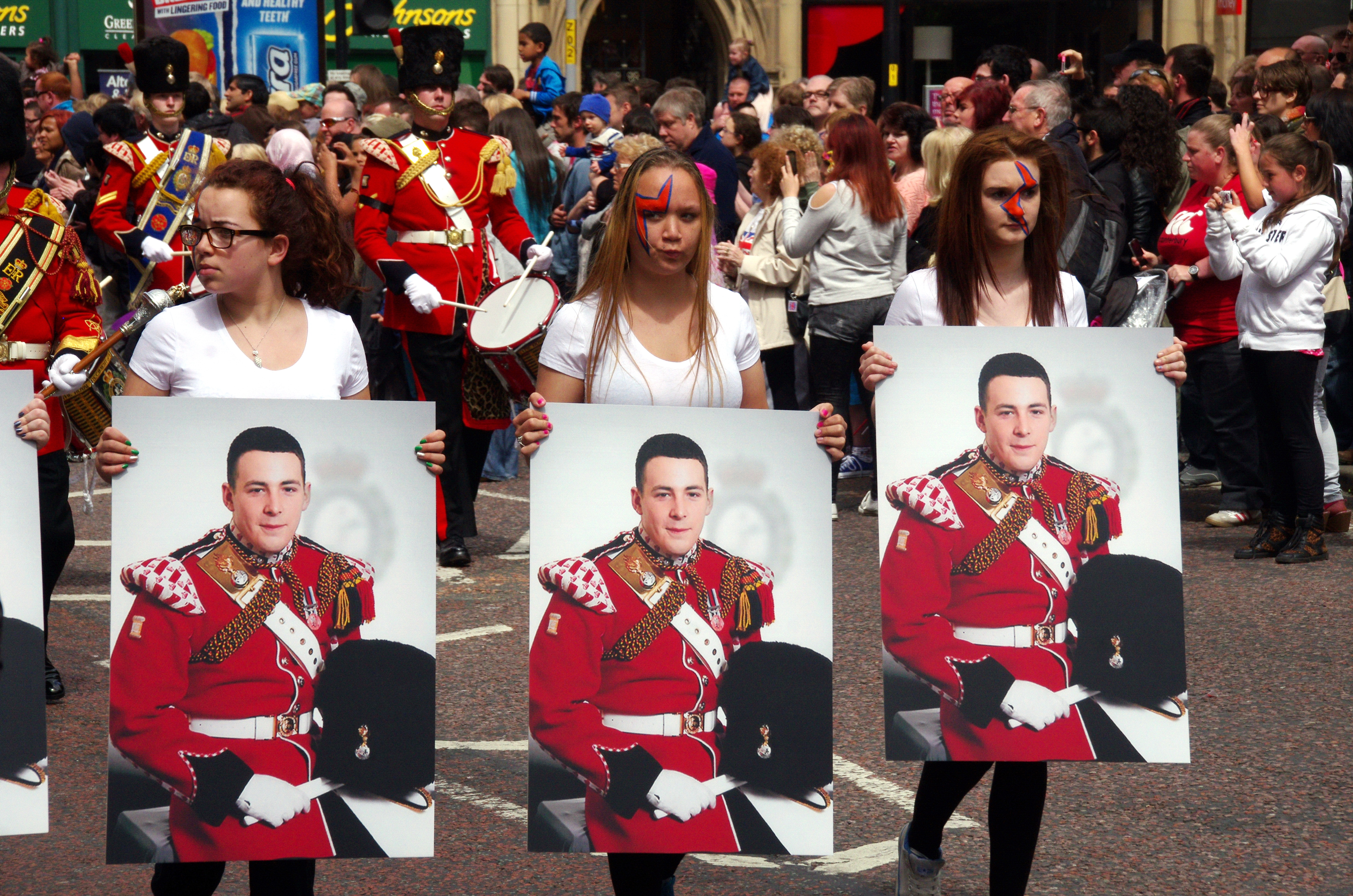
- Tribute to Lee Rigby, Manchester Day Parade, 2 June 2013
- Location: 51°29′18″N 0°03′44″E; Woolwich, Royal Borough of Greenwich, London, England
- Date: 22 May 2013; 13 years ago 14:20 BST (UTC+01:00)
- Attack type: Vehicle-ramming attack, attempted decapitation, Islamic terrorism
- Weapons: Car, cleaver, knife, and revolver
- Injuries: 2 (the perpetrators)
- Victim: Lee Rigby
- Perpetrators: Michael Adebolajo and Michael Adebowale
- Motive: Retaliation for British military presence in Islamic countries

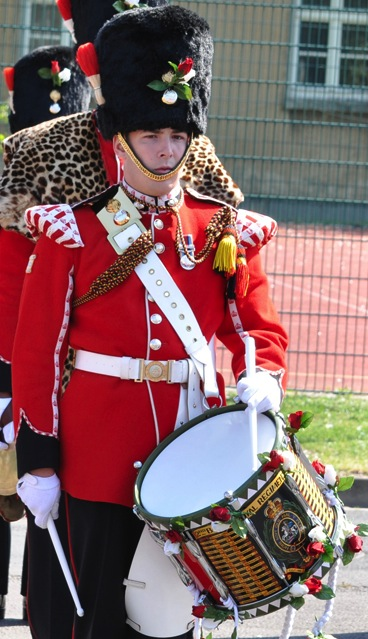
Fusilier Rigby of the 2nd Battalion Royal Regiment of Fusiliers in 2011

On the afternoon of 22 May 2013, a British Army soldier, Fusilier Lee Rigby of the Royal Regiment of Fusiliers, was killed by Islamist terrorists Michael Adebolajo and Michael Adebowale near the Royal Artillery Barracks in Woolwich, southeast London.

Rigby was off duty and walking along Wellington Street when he was attacked. Adebolajo and Adebowale ran him down with a car, then used knives and a cleaver to stab and hack him to death. The men dragged Rigby's body into the road and remained at the scene until police arrived, informing passers-by that they had murdered Rigby to avenge Muslims killed by the British military. Unarmed police arrived at the scene nine minutes after an emergency call was received and set up a cordon. Armed police officers arrived five minutes later. The assailants, armed with a cleaver and brandishing a gun, charged at the police, who fired shots that wounded them both. They were apprehended and taken to separate hospitals. Adebolajo and Adebowale are British of Nigerian descent, were raised as Christians, and converted to Islam.

On 19 December 2013, both of the attackers were found guilty of Rigby's murder. On 26 February 2014, they were sentenced to life imprisonment, with Adebolajo given a whole life order and Adebowale ordered to serve at least 45 years. The attack was condemned by political and Muslim leaders in the United Kingdom and in the international press.

== Victim ==
The soldier killed in the attack was 25-year-old Fusilier Lee James Rigby (4 July 1987 – 22 May 2013), a drummer and machine-gunner in the 2nd Battalion of the Royal Regiment of Fusiliers. Rigby, from Middleton, Greater Manchester, was born in 1987 and had served in Cyprus, Germany, and Afghanistan before becoming a recruiter and assisting with duties in the Tower of London. He was attacked when he was returning to barracks from working at the Tower. Rigby married in 2007 and had a two-year-old son, but had separated from his wife. He was engaged to a new fiancée at the time of his death. A post-mortem examination showed that Rigby died from "multiple incised wounds".

Rigby supported British Armed Forces charity Help for Heroes and was wearing a hoodie supporting the charity when he was attacked. In the five days after his death the charity received more than £600,000 in donations.

Rigby was given a military funeral at Bury Parish Church on 12 July 2013. The service was attended by several thousand people, including present and former soldiers, the prime minister David Cameron, and Mayor of London Boris Johnson. A private burial service was then held at nearby Middleton Cemetery. The first permanent memorial to him was installed in February 2014 at The Valley, a football stadium less than one mile (two kilometres) from the site of his murder.

== Attack ==
1 Location of the attack
2 Royal Artillery Barracks

The attack took place shortly before 14:20 in Wellington Street, and near its junction with John Wilson Street, part of the South Circular Road (A205) in Woolwich, near the perimeter of the Royal Artillery Barracks where Rigby was stationed. Rigby had arrived at Woolwich Arsenal station at 14:10 and was walking along Wellington Street towards the Barracks.

While Rigby was crossing the road to get to a shop, two men, who were later identified as Michael Adebolajo and Michael Adebowale, drove a Vauxhall Tigra at him at 30 to 40 mph (50 to 65 km/h), knocking him to the ground. They attacked Rigby with knives and a cleaver, and attempted to behead him.

Immediately after the attack, several passers-by stood over Rigby's body to protect him from further injury. Ingrid Loyau-Kennett, a cub scout leader from Cornwall, disembarked from a passing bus with the intention of rendering first aid, after she saw what she thought was a road accident. On discovering that the victim was dead she engaged one of the assailants in conversation. The man said he was responsible for killing the man on the ground – a British soldier who the attacker claimed had "killed Muslims in Iraq and in Afghanistan". She asked one of the men to hand over his weapons, but he refused.

In a video shot by a bystander, Adebolajo said "The only reason we have killed this man today is because Muslims are dying daily by British soldiers". Adebolajo also gave a bystander at the scene a handwritten two-page note which set out his justification for his actions. The assailants remained at the scene and asked bystanders to call the police. The Metropolitan Police received the first 999 call about an assault at 14:20 and unarmed police were deployed. Subsequent 999 calls said the attackers had a firearm, and armed police were ordered to the scene at 14:24. Unarmed police arrived at 14:29, set up a cordon, and remained behind it. Authorised firearms officers arrived at 14:34. The two men, one brandishing a cleaver and the other a revolver, charged at the police. Armed police fired eight times and both men were wounded. They were arrested and taken to separate hospitals. A revolver, knives, and a cleaver were seized at the scene. The victim, Rigby, was pronounced dead and formally identified. The revolver was later determined to be a non-functioning 90-year-old Dutch KNIL 9.4mm. Adebowale pointed the gun at responding armed police officers, who opened fire and shot off one of his thumbs.

== Attackers and other suspects ==
The two men who carried out the attack, Michael Olumide Adebolajo, 28, and Michael Oluwatobi Adebowale, 22, are British of Nigerian descent who came from Christian backgrounds. Both men were known to British security services.

On 23 May, a man aged 29 and two women aged 31 and 29 were arrested on suspicion of conspiracy to murder. The Metropolitan Police arrested three people aged between 21 and 28 in south-east London, at two separate locations on the evening of 25 May. On 26 May, a 22-year-old male was arrested in Highbury. On 27 May, a 50-year-old male was arrested in Welling. Of the eight people arrested, six were freed on bail, and two released without charge.

=== Michael Adebolajo ===
Michael Olumide Adebolajo, born December 1984 in Lambeth, went to Marshalls Park School in Romford and Havering Sixth Form College, and then went to study sociology at the University of Greenwich. He has a history of involvement in radical Islamist activities and had been arrested at a violent protest and later released. According to Anjem Choudary, a radical Muslim cleric, Adebolajo converted to Islam in 2003 and was linked to the outlawed Islamist group al-Muhajiroun. In 2006, Adebolajo was arrested outside the Old Bailey during a protest about the trial of Mizanur Rahman.

In 2009, Adebolajo spoke at a demonstration against the English Defence League and Stop Islamisation of Europe organised by Unite Against Fascism at Harrow Central Mosque. He was recorded saying: "Don't be scared of them, do not be scared of the police or the cameras. You are here only to please Allah. You're not here for any other reason, if you are here just for a fight, please leave our ranks. We only want those who are sincere to Allah. Purify your intention."

In 2010, Adebolajo was arrested in Kenya with five others. He travelled using a British passport in the name Michael Olemendis Ndemolajo. Boniface Mwaniki, head of Kenya's anti-terrorism unit, said he believed Adebolajo was planning to train with al-Shabaab, a militant group linked to al-Qaeda. He was released to British authorities in Kenya and deported. The British Foreign Office confirmed "a British national was arrested in Kenya in 2010" and was given consular assistance. No charges were filed against Adebolajo.

Abu Nusaybah, a friend of Adebolajo, said on BBC's Newsnight on 25 May that Adebolajo had complained of persistent questioning by the British Security Service (MI5) specifically concerning his knowledge of "certain individuals". He said Adebolajo alleged that MI5 had asked him to work with them and he had refused. He also said Adebolajo claimed he had been tortured and sexually assaulted by Kenyan troops after his arrest.

Adebolajo was released from hospital on 31 May and taken into police custody. The following day he was charged with Rigby's murder, two charges of attempting to murder police officers, and possession of a firearm. At a court appearance on 3 June, he asked to be known as Mujahid Abu Hamza. On 17 July, Adebolajo lost two of his front teeth while being restrained by five prison officers at Belmarsh Prison.

=== Michael Adebowale ===
Michael Oluwatobi Adebowale, born May 1991 in Denmark Hill, attended Kidbrooke School, later studying at the University of Greenwich with Michael Adebolajo. Adebowale's mother is a probation officer and his father a member of staff at the Nigerian High Commission. His parents separated shortly after his birth. In January 2008, Adebowale was injured in a stabbing at a drug den that killed an 18-year-old and injured a 16-year-old. The same year, he was convicted of drug dealing offences and was sentenced to 15 months imprisonment. Adebowale was known by his middle name and nicknamed "Tobi" before his conversion to Islam in 2009, adopting the name Ismael. Like Adebolajo, he was a follower of Anjem Choudary and frequently attended his rallies.

On 28 May, Adebowale was released from hospital and taken to a police station in south London. Police charged him with the murder of Rigby and possession of a firearm.

== Investigation ==
Investigators searched four houses in Greenwich, south London; one in Romford, east London; another in north London; and a property in Saxilby, Lincolnshire.

Malcolm Rifkind, the chairman of the Intelligence and Security Committee, said the committee would use new powers to retrieve documents from intelligence agencies. A written report is to be provided by Andrew Parker, the Director General of MI5.

An Independent Police Complaints Commission investigation into the use of firearms by Metropolitan Police Officers, which was published on 19 December 2013 once a verdict had been reached in the defendants' trial, concluded that the officers who had used force on 22 May 2013 had "acted entirely appropriately" and had shown "skill and professionalism".

The Home Secretary, Theresa May, chaired a meeting of the Cabinet Office Briefing Room committee (COBRA) attended by Defence Secretary Philip Hammond, the Mayor of London Boris Johnson, the Metropolitan Police Commissioner Sir Bernard Hogan-Howe, the Metropolitan Police Assistant Commissioner Cressida Dick and other unnamed members of the intelligence agencies. The Prime Minister David Cameron cut short a visit to Paris to chair a second COBRA meeting.

== Legal proceedings ==
On 31 May, the inquest into Rigby's death was opened and adjourned at Southwark Coroner's Court. The inquest heard that Rigby had been identified by his dental records.

On 27 September 2013, the two accused men appeared via videolink in court at the Old Bailey, where they both pleaded not guilty to the murder of Lee Rigby, and to other charges relating to the incident. The trial began at the Old Bailey on 29 November 2013. Adebolajo asked to be known as Mujahid Abu Hamza in court with Adebowale wishing to be known as Ismail Ibn Abdullah.

On 19 December 2013, Michael Adebolajo and Michael Adebowale were found guilty of the murder of Lee Rigby. The judge, Mr Justice Sweeney, said that he would pass sentence after a key appeal court ruling on the use of whole life terms. On 26 February 2014, both men were sentenced to life imprisonment. Adebolajo was given a whole life order excluding the possibility of parole, and Adebowale, the younger of the two, was given a minimum term of 45 years in prison.

During the sentencing, Mr Justice Sweeney said that the extremist views of the attackers were a "betrayal of Islam", prompting Adebowale to shout "That’s a lie", while Adebolajo shouted "Allahu Akbar". Following a scuffle with security guards in the dock, both men were removed from the court and the sentencing continued in their absence.

On 8 April 2014, Adebolajo launched an appeal against his whole life term. On 29 July, he was refused permission to appeal, and the case was heard by a panel of Court of Appeal judges.

In July 2014, a freedom of information request filed by The Sun showed that Adebolajo and Adebowale had received a combined £212,613.32 in legal aid.

On 3 December 2014, Rigby's killers lost legal challenges to their sentences. Michael Adebolajo had attempted to have his conviction overturned and whole-life sentence reduced, while Michael Adebowale attempted a reduction in his minimum sentence of 45 years. Both requests were rejected at the Court of Appeal.

== Subsequent events ==
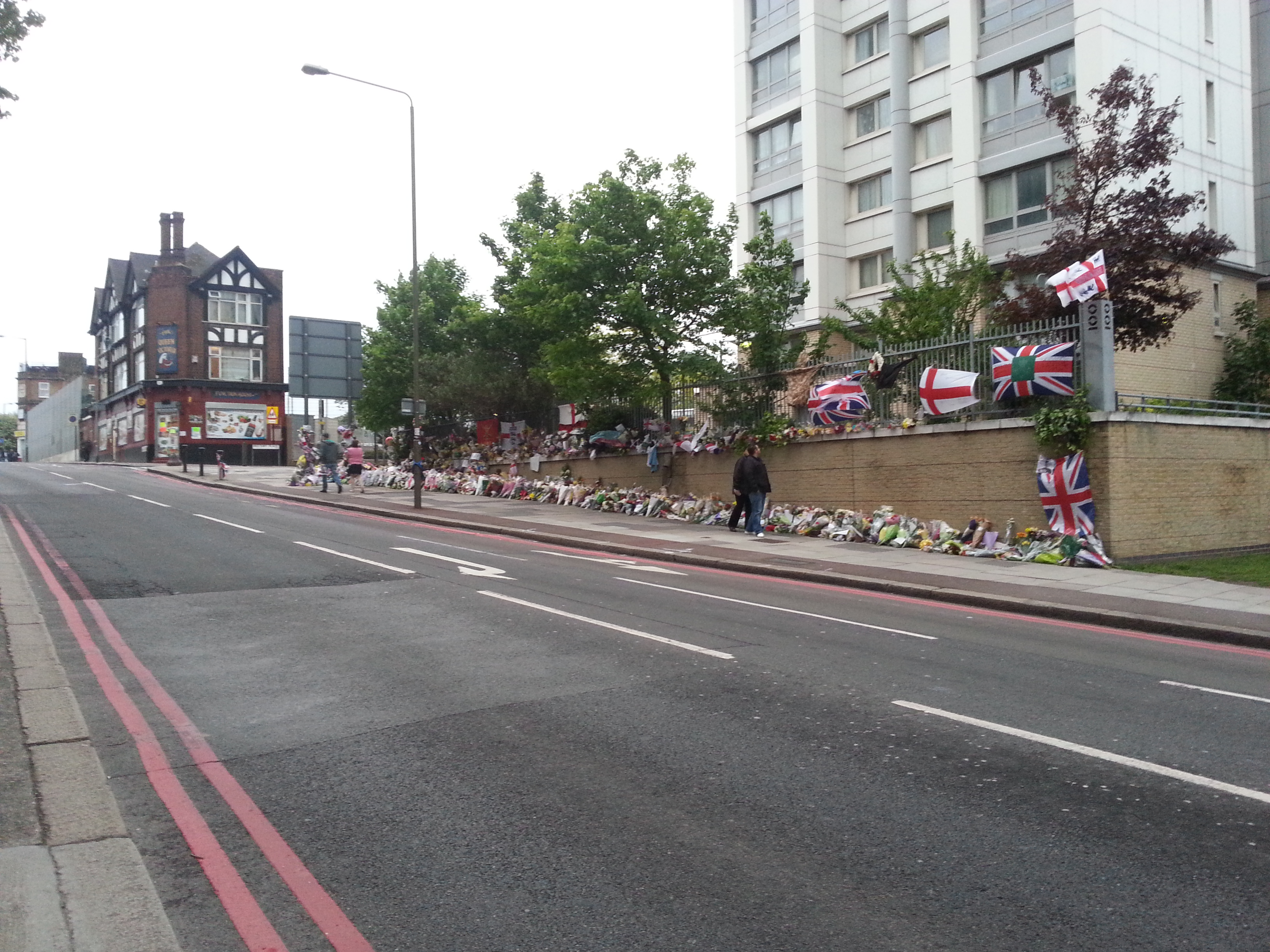
The site of the attack in Wellington Street, with floral tributes and flags, 30 May 2013

The Ministry of Defence investigated the incident. Immediately after the death, British service members were advised not to wear military uniforms in public, although the advice was later relaxed.

In the immediate aftermath, Julie Siddiqi of the Islamic Society of Britain expressed concern that the killing would be used to create ethnic and community divisions. Sir Bernard Hogan-Howe condemned the attack and called for a calm and "measured response", adding "we have met with community representatives, and extra officers remain on duty there tonight. Across London our officers are in contact with their communities too." Commander Simon Letchford later noted community concerns following the incident and assured that an investigation was under way. He also appealed for calm and avoidance of speculation. An additional 1,200 police officers were deployed across London to prevent revenge attacks on Muslim communities.

The British National Party (BNP) leader, Nick Griffin, posted a series of Twitter messages blaming "mass immigration" for the attack and called for a protest rally in Woolwich. After the English Defence League called on its supporters to mobilise, some members staged a protest at Woolwich Arsenal station in which bottles were thrown at police. The BNP scheduled their protest for 1 June, but Scotland Yard refused to permit them to march from Woolwich Barracks; the demonstration instead took place at Whitehall in central London. Unite Against Fascism mounted a counter-protest. Police arrested 58 people, for breaches of the Public Order Act.

On 7 June 2013, a 21-year-old woman from Harrow was ordered to complete 250 hours of unpaid work after tweeting that people in Help for Heroes T-shirts "deserve to be beheaded". On 14 March 2014, a married couple from London – who pleaded guilty to disseminating a terrorist publication – were jailed for posting videos on YouTube which condoned the death of Lee Rigby, with one video describing it as a "brilliant day".

In the aftermath of the attack, an anti-Muslim backlash occurred across the United Kingdom. A representative of Hope not Hate said the number of phone calls to its helpline concerning anti-Muslim incidents greatly increased after the murder. Hope not Hate reported 193 Islamophobic incidents, including attacks on 10 mosques, as of 27 May. On 1 June, Tell MAMA, a government-funded project, reported 212 anti-Muslim incidents, including 125 online incidents, 17 incidents involving physical attack, and 11 attacks on mosques.

Incidents ranged from verbal abuse to physical assaults in which women's headscarves were pulled off. Graffiti was scrawled over mosques and Muslim-owned businesses. Hope not Hate claimed that online activity suggested some of the attacks on Muslims were co-ordinated. At least seven people were arrested for a range of social media-related issues.

During the night after Rigby's death, two mosques were attacked. In Braintree, Essex, a man entered a mosque with two knives, threatened the congregation, and threw an explosive device, which witnesses said was a grenade or gas canister. In Gillingham, Kent, a man ran into a mosque and smashed windows and bookcases, specifically targeting those containing copies of the Quran; two men were arrested in connection with the attacks. On 26 May, several petrol bombs were thrown into a mosque in Grimsby, but no one was injured and the fires were rapidly extinguished. Two former soldiers were convicted of the attack and jailed for six years each.

On 5 June, the Al-Rahma Islamic Centre in Muswell Hill – which was used by children after school – was destroyed by a fire, and the building had been sprayed with graffiti making reference to the English Defence League. The fire investigation was conducted by Scotland Yard's counter-terrorism command, because of a possible link to domestic extremism. On 8 June, a fire at Darul Uloom School, an Islamic boarding school in southeast London, forced the evacuation of 128 students and teachers, with police suspecting that the incident may have been a revenge attack. On 10 June, a senior Metropolitan Police officer confirmed there had been an eight-fold increase in the number of Islamophobic incidents since Rigby's death, and that the real figure may be higher due to under-reporting.

In the London Borough of Hackney the Stamford Hill Shomrim, a Jewish volunteer Neighbourhood Patrol Group, made an offer of help to the local Muslim community which was welcomed and subsequently commended by Hackney Police Borough Commander Chief Superintendent Matthew Horne.

=== Video footage controversy ===
Video footage of one of the perpetrators justifying the killing of Lee Rigby was obtained by The Sun and ITN. ITN's video, which was edited before it was broadcast, aired during the 18:30 ITV News bulletin before the 21:00 watershed, and again in its 22:00 bulletin. After being posted on the ITN website in the afternoon, the high level of visits caused the site to crash and go offline for around half an hour. Total traffic on the site, which averages 860,000 unique users per week, reached 1.2 million for the day of the attack.

Managing editor of The Sun, Richard Caseby, said the newspaper had faced "a very difficult decision". Both media outlets argued they had released the video "in the public interest". BBC News showed some parts of the video. Sky News decided not to follow suit, as senior editors were of the opinion that the graphic images were "unnecessarily distressing". Both ITV and the BBC ran warnings before showing the footage. Most of Britain's national daily newspapers grabbed still images from the video footage for their front pages the next morning. A BBC executive said that the news organisation edited the footage before broadcasting, and "dealt with the material as carefully as we could." The spokesman said they "thought very carefully about the pictures...and gave great consideration to how we used the footage". They argued that the footage was an important element of the story and shed light on the perpetrators and the possible motives for the attack."

The Guardian reported there were "around 800 complaints from distressed viewers". Most complaints were targeted at the television coverage, with ITV receiving 400 complaints in the 24 hours following the broadcast. Sky News, which showed a still image of one of the suspected attackers with bloodied hands, received "a handful of complaints".

On 17 June, the broadcasting standards watchdog Ofcom launched an investigation into broadcast of footage from the attack after receiving about 700 complaints. Ofcom published its findings on 6 January 2014, ruling that the news footage had not breached broadcasting regulations. Ofcom issued new guidelines to news outlets on giving appropriate warnings before airing distressing content.

=== Anti-terrorism task force ===
The UK government established a task force to look at ways of stemming the growth of Islamic extremism in Britain, focusing on the radicalisation of worshippers in mosques, university students and prisoners. The task force – chaired by David Cameron – had its inaugural meeting at 10 Downing Street on 3 June 2013, and includes Cabinet Ministers, and representatives from the police and intelligence services. Later that day Cameron made a House of Commons statement on the Woolwich attack, saying that lessons must be learned. "When young men born and bred in this country are radicalised and turned into killers, we have to ask some tough questions about what is happening in our country. It is as if that for some young people there is a conveyor belt to radicalisation that has poisoned their minds with sick and perverted ideas. We need to dismantle this process at every stage – in schools, colleges, universities, on the internet, in our prisons, wherever it is taking place."

=== Parliamentary inquiry ===
On 25 November 2014, the findings of a British parliamentary inquiry into Rigby's murder was published. The report found that his death could not have been prevented, although his killers had appeared in seven intelligence investigations. In December 2012, Michael Adebowale had discussed killing a soldier on Facebook with a foreign-based extremist known as "Foxtrot". The UK authorities did not have access to the details of the conversation until June 2013, when they were disclosed to GCHQ. The Intelligence and Security Committee stated "Had MI5 had access to this exchange, their investigation into Adebowale would have become a top priority." Facebook said that it did not comment on individual cases, but responded that "Facebook’s policies are clear, we do not allow terrorist content on the site and take steps to prevent people from using our service for these purposes." In an interview with BBC News on 26 November 2014, Richard Barrett, the former Director of Global Counter-terrorism at MI6, said that it was unfair to expect companies to monitor websites for all potentially extremist content. Facebook had blocked seven of Adebowale's accounts prior to the killing, five of which had been flagged for links with extremism. The accounts had been flagged by an automated process, and no person at Facebook had manually checked the accounts.

=== Killer's regret ===
On 3 June 2018, Rigby's murderer Michael Adebolajo said he regretted the act and apologised for the first time, according to prison sources. Adebolajo added that he "misinterpreted" the Quran to justify his actions and that he was brainwashed. Lee's mother Lyn Rigby said she does not accept his apology and will "never" forgive him.

=== Broadmoor incident ===
On 20 July 2018 Adebowale was involved in an altercation with medical staff at Broadmoor Hospital, where he was being treated for paranoid schizophrenia. A nurse named Jason Taplin asked him to turn down the volume on a television he was watching, at which point Adebowale punched him in the face. Adebowale pleaded guilty to assault occasioning actual bodily harm in 2019 and was sentenced to eight months in prison, to be served after his 45-year minimum tariff is complete.

== Reactions ==
Queen Elizabeth II, political leaders and religious leaders variously expressed concern and distress over the incident, and called for calm. The Prime Minister, David Cameron, made the following statement:

This country will be absolutely resolute in its stand against extremism and terror. This action was a betrayal of Islam and the Muslim communities that give so much to our country. We will defeat violent extremism by standing together. We will not rest until we know every detail. [The attackers told Ingrid Loyau-Kennett that] they wanted to start a war in London and she replied, "You are going to lose, it is you against many." She speaks for all of us.

Many Muslim leaders denounced the attack. The Prime Minister's statement was echoed by Shaykh Ibrahim Mogra, with the Archbishop of Canterbury, Justin Welby, the co-chair of the Christian Muslim Forum, in a joint statement. The Muslim Council of Britain said the attack "has no basis in Islam and we condemn this unreservedly". The head of the Ramadhan Foundation, Mohammed Shafiq, also condemned the attack. The director of Faith Matters and co-ordinator of the government-backed anti-Islamophobic project Tell MAMA stated: "We, as the Muslim community, will work against anyone who promotes such hatred."

Anjem Choudary refused to condemn the attack. He said, "I'm not in the business of condemnation or condoning. I think if anyone needs to be condemned it is the British government and their foreign policy. It's so clear that that is the cause." On BBC's Newsnight, when Choudary was questioned about his role in the radicalisation of Michael Adebolajo, he denied any responsibility, and talked about such radicalisation as a means to an end. He stated that he believed that not many Muslims would disagree with what Adebolajo had said in his videoed statement.

Asghar Bukhari of the Muslim Public Affairs Committee UK said that both the British Government and the Muslim community were at fault in dealing with "extremism". He criticised the British Government for being involved in wars in Iraq and Afghanistan while "completely denying that it has anything to do with the political situation around the Muslim world", and said that Muslim organisations "have failed their own community by not teaching these young, angry men how to get a democratic change to this policy that's ruining so many lives". He described Muslim leaders as unwilling to bring about change, focussing on points of theology, rather than the practical education of young people in ways to achieve political change.

Baroness Neville-Jones, a former security minister and chairman of the British Joint Intelligence Committee, and Colonel Richard Kemp, a former Army commander, suggested blame could be put on internet hate preaching. Neville-Jones told the BBC Radio 4's Today programme that "the inspiration that comes from internet hate preaching and jihadist rhetoric...is a very, very serious problem now."

George Galloway, then an MP, said that the attack on Lee Rigby was "indefensible". He criticised British support for the Syrian rebels, stating that similar attacks are likely to occur "as long as we are, as a country, involved in spreading murder and mayhem across the Muslim world."

Former UK Prime Minister Tony Blair saw the attack not as an isolated expression of two crazed individuals but part of the broader "trouble within Islam".

In foreign press reports there was widespread outrage and condemnation of the killing. Yusif al-Shihab, in Kuwait's Al-Abas, stated that the assailants have "deformed the image of Islam" while Batir Mohammad Wardum in the Jordanian daily Al-Dustur, and other Middle Eastern newspapers, stressed that their actions have endangered the lives of thousands of Muslims.

In a statement issued on 28 May, Adebolajo's relatives condemned terrorism and violence in the name of religion, and expressed their horror at Rigby's death.

In October 2013, British anti-terrorist police warned several Muslims who had spoken out against Islamist extremism, some of them explicitly against the murder of Rigby, that they had been targeted in a video created by al-Shabaab, the group responsible for the attack on the Westgate shopping mall in Kenya.

== Attempted copycat cases ==
On 19 February 2015, 19-year-old Brusthom Ziamani was found guilty of preparing a terrorist act. He was arrested in London in August 2014 while carrying a 30 cm (12 in) knife, hammer, and jihadist flag. Ziamani had said that he intended to attack and kill soldiers, and had described Adebolajo as a "legend". On 20 March, Ziamani was sentenced to 22 years in prison. On 29 April 2015, 18-year-old Kazi Islam, who was inspired by the murder, was convicted by a jury at the Old Bailey of grooming a vulnerable friend to kill two soldiers, and buying ingredients for a pipe bomb. On 29 May, he was sentenced to eight years in a young offenders' institution. On 14 January 2015, 26-year-old white supremacist Zack Davies of Mold, Flintshire attacked a Sikh dentist in a Tesco supermarket with a machete and a hammer. He claimed in court that the attack was revenge for the murder of Rigby. Davies was sentenced to life imprisonment on 11 September 2015.

== Memorials ==
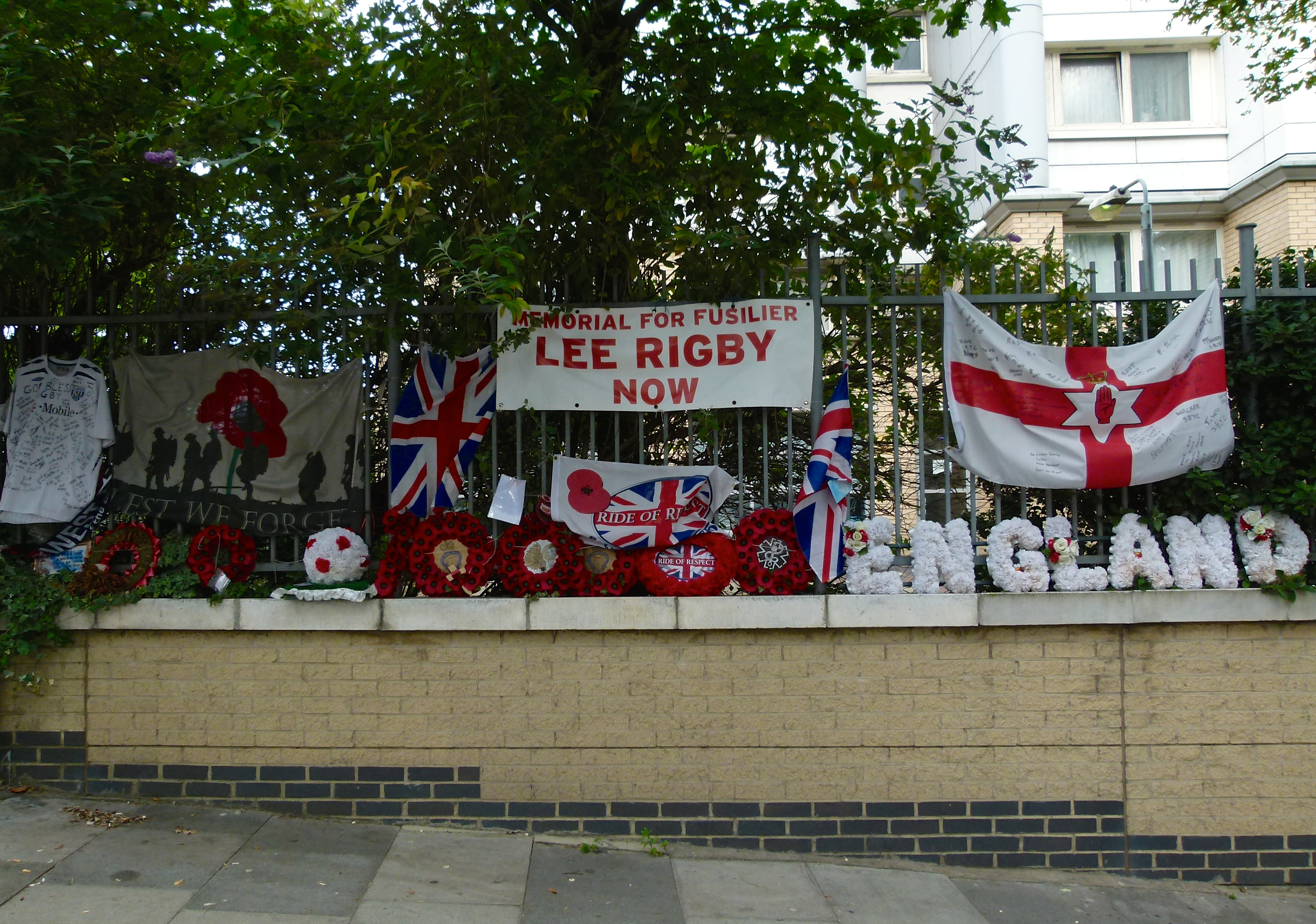
The murder site in 2015

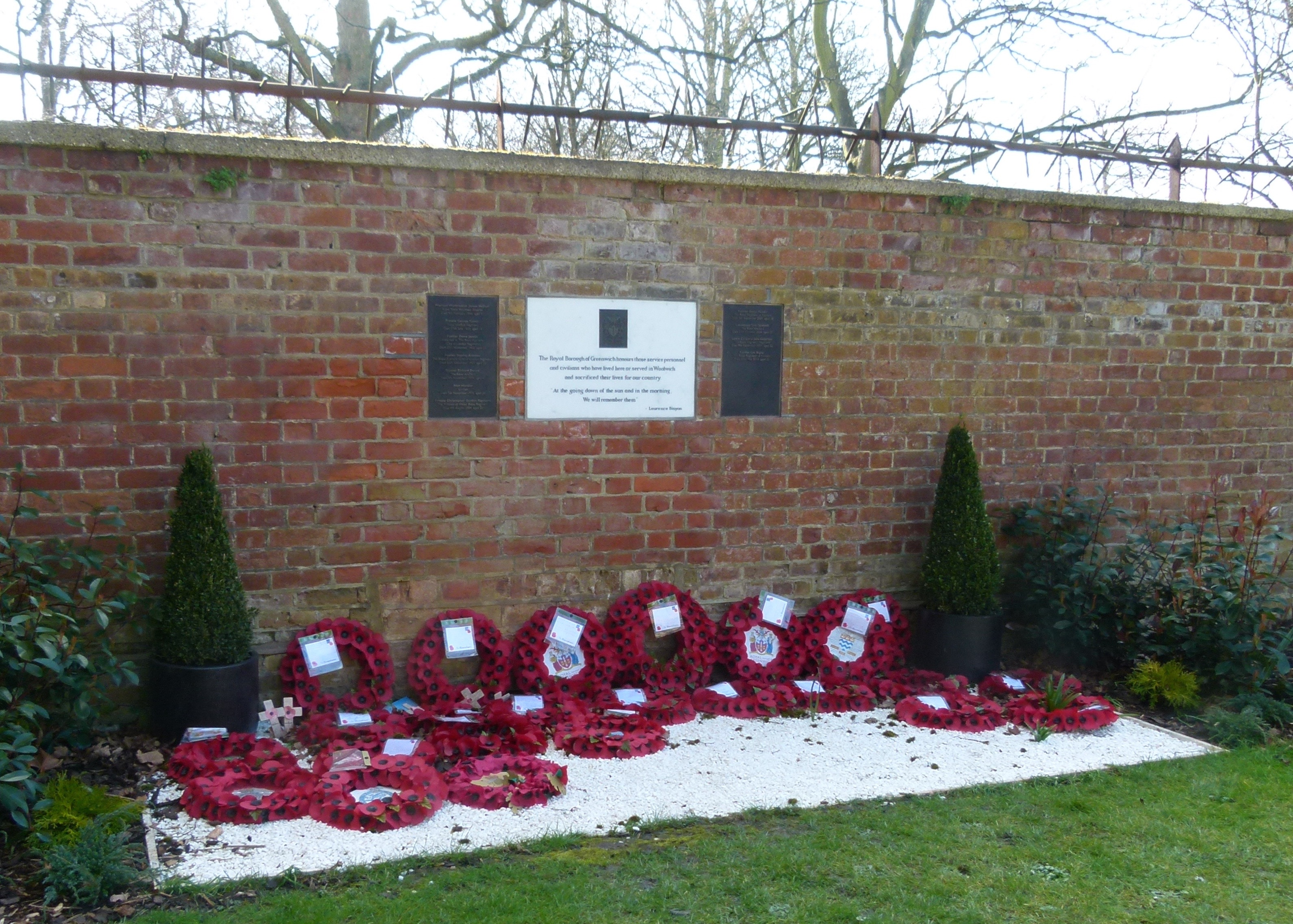
Memorial in St George's Garrison Church, Woolwich

On 1 September 2014, Rigby was honoured at a ceremony in Staffordshire, with his name added to the Armed Forces Memorial at the National Memorial Arboretum.

A memorial to Rigby in his home town of Middleton, Greater Manchester, consisting of a bronze drum and a plaque, was unveiled on 29 March 2015.

Plans for a memorial to Rigby in Woolwich initially ran into opposition from local MP Nick Raynsford, who expressed concerns that it would generate "undesirable interest from extremists" or become a target for vandals. Greenwich Council said that it had not received a request from the Army to erect a memorial at the site. Meanwhile, the site of the murder on Wellington Street developed into an unofficial memorial site. Following a campaign for a memorial supported by Boris Johnson and a petition with 25,000 signatures, plans for a memorial near the site of the attack were announced on 11 June 2014. The memorial was revealed on 11 November 2015 after considerable delays, as "the council had had to balance different opinions about how Lee Rigby should be commemorated". Lee Rigby's name appears on a plaque on the south wall of the memorial garden inside the ruined St George's Garrison Church in Woolwich, opposite the Royal Artillery Barracks. The memorial consists of a white marble plaque marking Woolwich's history as a barracks town, and two bronze plaques with the names of 11 men who served or lived in Woolwich and gave their lives in the service of their country, including Rigby and the victims of the 1974 King's Arms bombing nearby. In April 2016 the family stated, in relation to calls for a memorial: "There is a permanent memorial to Lee at St George's Chapel in Woolwich, which is what we wanted".

On 29 February 2020, a memorial to Rigby was unveiled at Millwall F.C.'s stadium, The New Den, with members of Rigby's regiment in attendance. Fans of the club raised the funds to pay for the plaque, which was donated free of charge by local funeral directors with the money going to charity.

== Legacy and Foundation ==
The Lee Rigby Foundation was established by Lyn and Ian Rigby after their son's murder. The organisation was set up as a support network for bereaved military families, establishing a series of static caravans that families can use for a holiday break. Lee Rigby House in Staffordshire was also established for this purpose, with the premises donated by former professional wrestler Peter Thornley.

In 2023 Rigby's son, two years old at the time of the attack, was awarded a "Pride of Britain" award for his fund-raising work for Scotty's Little Soldiers, in his father's memory.

== See also ==
- 1983 Royal Artillery Barracks bombing
- 7 July 2005 London bombings
- 21 July 2005 London attempted bombings
- 2007 plot to behead a British Muslim soldier
- 2008 Exeter attempted bombing
- 2015 Leytonstone tube station attack
- List of terrorist incidents in London
- Terrorism in the United Kingdom
