= Sunny Hundal =

British journalist

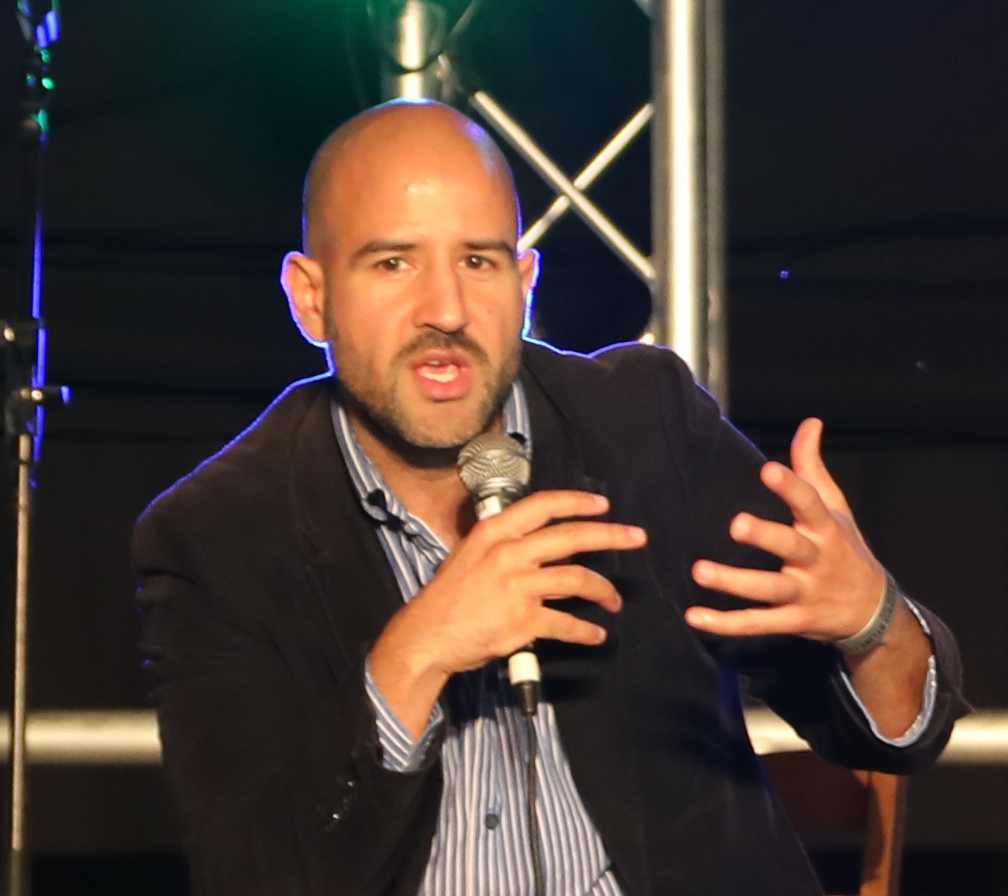
- Born: Sundeep Singh Hundal; London, England
- Education: Economics
- Alma mater: Brunel University London
- Occupation: Journalist
- Years active: 2006–present
- Known for: Journalism, Blogging, Academia
- Relatives: Jagraj Singh

Sunny Hundal (born Sundeep Singh Hundal in 1977) is a British journalist and blogger.

Born in London to Sikh parents of Indian origin, Hundal has a degree in economics from Brunel University. He is best known as the founder and editor of the centre-left group blog Liberal Conspiracy. The Guardian's website named him as their blogger of the year in 2006. Hundal has also written for publications including The Guardian, The Financial Times, New Statesman and The Independent.

In June 2019, he helped to found a progressive news aggregator, Front Page Live, where he serves as Editorial Director UK. He is also a journalist-in-residence at Kingston University.

Hundal is a Covenor of the cross-party political movement, More United.

== Projects ==
Hundal has founded and edited a number of politically progressive websites: Liberal Conspiracy, a group weblog about politics and media, Asians in Media, Barfi Culture community websites, the Pickled Politics weblog, and the New Generation Network in 2006, a group and manifesto that attempted to challenge the current discourse on race relations in the UK. All these have been wound up.

In February 2007 he made a BBC radio documentary Lost in Translation about Asian brides brought to the UK. The BBC also quoted his claim that Shahrukh Khan's endorsement of skin-lightening creams was "completely immoral".

In June 2019, he helped to found a progressive news aggregator, Front Page Live, together with Joe Romm, its Editor-in-Chief, Carl Cameron, Laura Dawn, Helen Stickler and others. He serves as Editorial Director UK at Front Page Live.

== Political stances ==
In 2008, he wrote a blog post saying that non-white voters should consider voting Conservative, on the basis that "brown people" were being deliberately targeted by anti-terrorism legislation brought in by the New Labour government of Gordon Brown. In 2010, on his Liberal Conspiracy blog, he backed the Liberal Democrats in the UK General Election.

About three months after the formation of the Cameron–Clegg coalition, Hundal joined the Labour Party to influence its political direction. In August 2010 Hundal backed Ed Miliband in the Labour leadership election.

Hundal has criticised various religious organisations including the Islamist Hizb ut-Tahrir, the Muslim Council of Britain, Muslim Public Affairs Committee UK, Christian Concern For Our Nation, Sikh Federation and Hindu Forum of Britain. He has been awarded the Fourth IRDS Awards for Print Media for fighting against religious obscurantism, awarded by the Lucknow-based Institute for Research and Documentation in Social Sciences (IRDS).

In 2014 he defended the Tricycle Theatre's decision to boycott the UK Jewish Film Festival as a result of a £1,400 donation the festival received from the Israeli Embassy.

A vegetarian, he describes himself as a strong environmentalist.

== See also ==
- List of British Sikhs
