= Jagraj Singh =

British Sikh preacher

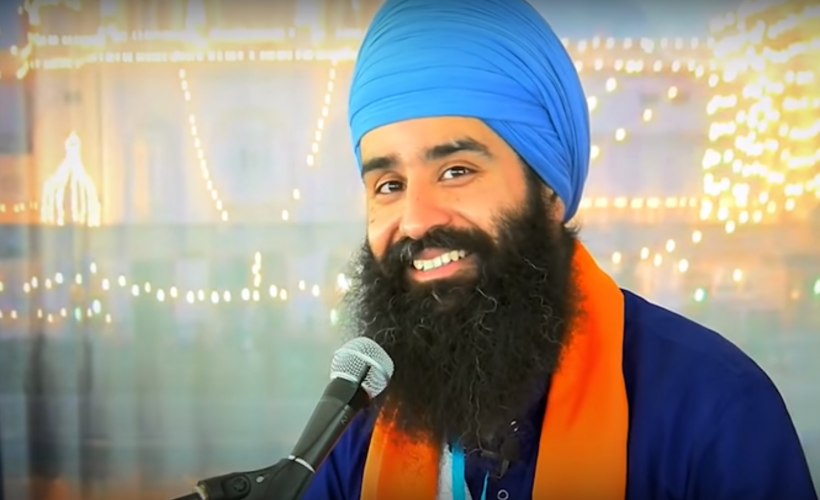
- Born: Jagraj Singh Hundal; 3 June 1979; London, United Kingdom
- Died: 20 July 2017 (aged 38)
- Other name: Bhai Jagraj Singh
- Education: University of Oxford
- Occupations: Sikh Preacher; British Army officer
- Years active: 2012 - 2017
- Organization: Basics of Sikhi
- Known for: Founder of Basics of Sikhi
- Family: Sunny Hundal (brother)

Jagraj Singh Hundal (3 June 1979 – 20 July 2017), known as Bhai Jagraj Singh, was a British Army officer and Sikh preacher. He was the founder of Sikh organisations, Everything's 13, and the Sikh Press Association and YouTube channel Basics of Sikhi.

Jagraj is considered as one of the most influential British Sikhs of the 21st century. He has been described as a pioneer of digital Sikh preaching.

== Early life and education ==
Jagraj was born on 3 June 1979, and grew up and attended secondary school in Hounslow, London. He studied Philosophy, Politics and Economics at the University of Oxford.

His elder brother is journalist Sunny Hundal.

== Career ==
Everything's 13 logo

After graduating from the Royal Military Academy Sandhurst, Singh was commissioned into the Royal Logistic Corps before finding a job in the finance and recruitment sector.

Basics of Sikhi logo

In 2012, he founded Everything's 13, a project to spread awareness of the Sikh faith both digitally and through the English language. His most notable work was YouTube channel, Basics of Sikhi. The channel he founded educated the general public about the basic tenets of the Sikh religion and raised awareness about its existence using parchaar (preaching). In 2014, Singh founded the Sikh Press Association (SikhPA).

In February 2017, Singh was awarded a Point of Light Award by UK Prime Minister Theresa May. In the award letter, May wrote: "Your important work is doing much to positively engage both young Sikhs and the wider community with your faith. You are inspiring those of all faiths and none to make a difference with their lives".

== Family life and death ==
In December 2016, he was diagnosed with stage 4 inoperable liver cancer and died on 20 July 2017.

He was survived by his wife Sukhmani Kaur and their three children.

== Awards ==
- Point of Light Award in 2017

== See also ==
- List of Sikhs
- Sikhism in the United Kingdom
- Basics of Sikhi
