= Basics of Sikhi =

Sikh educational institution and charity

- ਸਿੱਖੀ ਦੀਆਂ ਮੂਲ ਗੱਲਾਂ
- Abbreviation: BoS
- Formation: 2012
- Founder: Jagraj Singh
- Type: Nonprofit
- Registration no.: 113262 (Charity ID)
- Legal status: Charity
- Purpose: Sikh Religious Education • Charity
- Headquarters: United Kingdom
- Location: United Kingdom (main) • Canada • Australia • New Zealand • Malaysia
- Methods: Online platforms • In-person activities
- Official language: English • Punjabi
- Parent organization: Everythings 13
- Affiliations: SikhPressAssociation • Everythings 13 • Basics of Sikhi Canada
- Award: Point of Light • Sikh Awards 2014 • Sikh Organisation of the Year 2016
- Website: https://www.basicsofsikhi.com

Basics of Sikhi (BoS) is a Sikh educational initiative and charity founded in the United Kingdom by Jagraj Singh in 2012. It aims to promote understanding of Sikh teachings and philosophy through engaging resources and community outreach. As of 2021, the organization's YouTube channel had produced 2,500 videos and had over 170,000 subscribers, with content being produced in up to eighteen different languages.

Based in the United Kingdom, it focuses on providing clear, accessible information about Sikhism's core beliefs, practices and values. Basics of Sikhi have been accredited as being influential in the revival of young Sikhs across the globe in returning to their faith.

BoS has online resources about the Sikh religion in English, Punjabi, Spanish, Chinese, Russian, Hindi and French.

== Background ==
Under its parent organisation Everything's 13, a UK registered charity, Basics of Sikhi was founded in 2012 by Jagraj Singh in the United Kingdom as a response to the increasing demand for accessible and relatable Sikh education.

Everything's 13 comprises four child-organizations: Basics of Sikhi (BoS), the Sikh Press Association (SikhPA), Mighty Khalsa, and Kiddie Sangat.

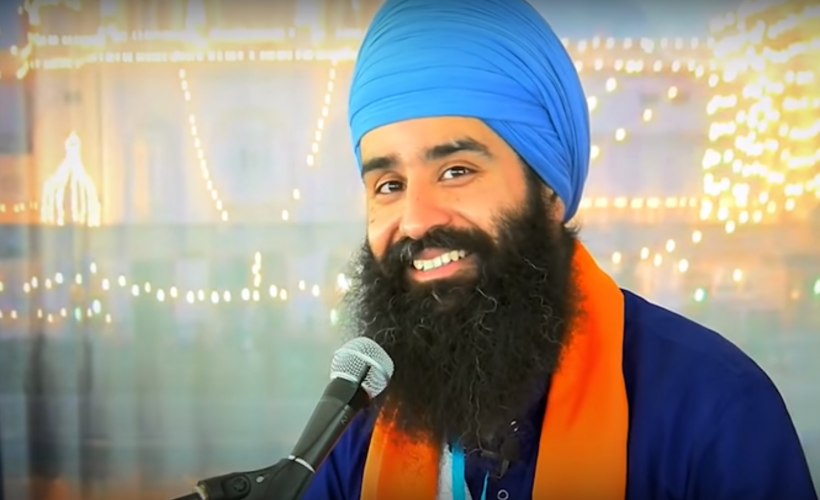
Basics of Sikhi founder, Jagraj Singh

Recognizing the challenges faced by younger generations and individuals outside the faith in understanding Sikh beliefs, Singh set out to create an initiative that would bridge this gap. His vision was rooted in providing a sense of identity and belonging within the Sikh community while also promoting awareness among the broader public.

Jagraj Singh, who had studied in Philosophy, Politics and Economics at the University of Oxford, began his efforts by utilizing digital platforms such as YouTube to reach a global audience.

== Activities ==
Basics of Sikhi embodies a modern approach to Sikh education, addressing the unique challenges and opportunities presented by contemporary society. The initiative produces a wide range of videos mainly in both English and Punjabi, ensuring accessibility for diverse audiences. The videos cover various topics, including the significance of Sikh scriptures, the importance of community service, also known as Sevā and applications of Sikh values in everyday life.

YouTube videos produced by BoS generally fall into three categories: out-reach, in-reach, and debates.

In 2017, Jagraj Singh died with stage 4 inoperable liver cancer

In 2019, Bos announced it would be doing more specific legal protections for Sikhs carrying kirpans and had launched a campaign to educate the public.

In 2023, BoS supported the motion made by the Akal Takht stop destination weddings involving the Sikh Anand Karaj.

== Reception ==
As a result of the success of Basics of Sikhi, Jagraj Singh was honoured with the Points of Light award by Prime Minister of the United Kingdom, Theresa May in 2017. In the award letter, May wrote: "Your important work is doing much to positively engage both young Sikhs and the wider community with your faith. You are inspiring those of all faiths and none to make a difference with their lives".

Everything's 13, the parental organisation of Basics of Sikhi

== Affiliate organisations ==
- Sikh Press Association (SikhPA)
- Everything's 13 (registered UK charity)
- Basics of Sikhi Canada (registered Canadian charity)

== See also ==
- Sikhism in the United Kingdom
- Jagraj Singh
- Sikhism
- Sikh literature
- Sikhism in Canada
