= Asghar Bukhari =

British activist

Asghar Bukhari is a British Muslim campaigner and political commentator. He is known for being a founding member and spokesperson of the Muslim Public Affairs Committee UK (MPACUK).

== Background ==
Bukhari has stated that he believes it is his duty as a Muslim to engage in the community through political activism. During his tenure as MPACUK's most prominent public representative, Bukhari and the organisation have run into controversy over accusations of antisemitism. Citing frustration at the lack of Muslim activism and support in the UK, he left MPACUK in September 2015.

== David Irving controversy ==
In 2006, it was reported that Bukhari had sent the English Holocaust denier David Irving a £60 cheque and a letter headed with a quote attributed to John Locke, "All that is needed for evil to triumph is for good people to stand idle". In one email Bukhari wrote to Irving: "You may feel like you are on your own but rest assured many people are with you in your fight for the Truth!". He told The Observer: "At the time [in 2000] I was of the belief he [Irving] was anti-Zionist, being smeared for nothing more then [sic] being anti-Zionist" and that the "pro-Israeli lobby often accuse[s] people of anti-Semitism".

Bukhari then published an audiocast in which he stated: "David Irving claimed he was not anti-Semitic and was in fact being attacked by the powerful pro-Israeli lobby; in short, being smeared. ... I believed him, it's as simple as that. ... I would not have supported anyone who is anti-Semitic". "Everyone knew about Irving's Holocaust denying but Mr Bukhari somehow managed to miss it", wrote David Aaronovitch in The Times shortly after the article in The Observer was published.

== Facebook comments on Israel and jihad ==
During the 2008 Gaza War, Bukhari wrote in a Facebook thread: "Muslims who fight against the occupation of their lands are 'Mujahadeen' and are blessed by Allah. And any Muslim who fights and dies against Israel and dies is a martyr and will be granted paradise". He also wrote that "The concept of jihad is a beautiful thing, and logical to those with a sincere heart". The Centre for Social Cohesion reported Bukhari to the police for contravening the new law banning the "glorification of terrorism".

== Comments on Woolwich attacks ==
Shortly after two Nigerian Islamists murdered a serving British soldier, Lee Rigby, in a Woolwich street in 2013 as he was walking back to the Royal Artillery Barracks, Bukhari was justifying the attack on a BBC News channel. Aisha Patel of the New York Daily Sun criticized the BBC for inviting Bukhari to give his opinion and said "Asghar Bukhari is not representative of Muslims. He is a representative of political Islam which has no place in British politics in the hothead, extremist form personified by Bukhari".

== Comments on Charlie Hebdo ==
On 8 January 2015, in a live Sky News broadcast the day after 12 people were murdered in the offices of the French magazine Charlie Hebdo, Bukhari repeatedly said the murdered cartoonists of the publication were racists.

== Facebook and YouTube posts on Shoe Theft ==
In June 2015, Bukhari posted on Facebook saying that "Zionists" had tried to intimidate him by entering his home and stealing one shoe. He went on to say that it is possible that these tactics are used by various organisations for intimidation purposes. The hashtag "Mossad Stole My Shoe" was trending on Twitter.

Bukhari's post to Facebook on 12 June 2015:

ARE ZIONISTS TRYING TO INTIMIDATE ME:
Someone came into my home yesterday, while I was asleep. I dont know how they got in, but they didn't break in - the only thing they took was one shoe. Now think about that, the only thing they took was a single shoe - they left one shoe behind to let me know someone had been there.
Of course I cant prove anything and thats part of the intimidation. The game is simple - to make me feel vulnerable in my own home. Its Psychological. Neither can I do much about it.
It is not the first time I have heard this happening. I have had another Muslim leader call me a year or so ago, in tears - she told me they had been coming into her house and re-arranging things - just to let her know they had been there.
There is one good thing that comes out of all oppression however - for those who are smart - from my misfortune, others can learn how they operate. Share this widely, for if it is happening to me, I am sure it happening to many, many others who have not exposed it.

On 19 June 2015, Bukhari posted a 10-minute YouTube video in which he says his shoe/slipper was found by his neighbors in their garden, but the people who are "poo-pooing" his theory that the Zionists are behind the shoe going missing are wrong because it was the Zionists.

Various memes cropped up mocking Bukhari's allegations, but his shoe also became the subject of a Twitter account and a jokey Change.org petition demanding its return which was signed by several hundred people. Israel's ambassador to South Africa, Arthur Lenk, tweeted: "We have your shoe, @AsgharBukhari. Call me." Maajid Nawaz, a former radical Islamist turned liberal activist and chairman of the anti-extremist Quilliam think-tank said in an interview with the BBC that there is an unhealthy anti-Semitic strand to Bukhari's thinking. People who disagree with Bukhari or criticise him such as making fun of his shoe loss theory are described as "pro-Zionist stooges, or neoconservatives, or Uncle Toms."
