= Liberal Conspiracy =

- Website type: Blog
- Dissolved: 2021
- Owner: Sunny Hundal (editor)
- Creator: Multiple contributors
- Commercial: No
- Launched: 2007
- Current status: Closed

Liberal Conspiracy was a British left-wing political blog established in November 2007 and edited by Sunny Hundal. Writing in The Guardian, Hundal claimed he set up the site to help "think past single-issue campaigns and work together to push a progressive agenda for Britain ... We have to rebuild the grassroots and translate that into political action by using the web".

== Content ==
Content has been produced by about 250 contributors, and at its peak the blog recorded 180,000 unique visitors in July 2011, as reported by Hundal to website journalism.co.uk. The site was designed by Hundal and Robert Sharp.

== Closure ==
On 25 October 2013 Sunny Hundal announced that he no longer had the time to maintain Liberal Conspiracy as a daily-updated blog, and that "the market for opinion is over-saturated", so the website would become an occasionally updated personal blog. It remained available in archived form with no new entries and no commenting setup until 21 September 2021, at which point it entirely dissolved.
