= Catherine Heseltine =

British activist (born 1978)

- Born: 1978 (age 47–48); Chelsea, London, England
- Spouses: Syed Hossain (m. 1998; div. 2005) Muhammad Ali (m. 2010)

Catherine Heseltine (born 1978) is a British activist. In 2010, she was elected as the CEO of Muslim Public Affairs Committee UK, a Muslim pressure group that opposes Zionism and Islamophobia.

== Early life ==
Heseltine grew up in North London. She attended Westminster School and met her future husband, Syed Hossein, when they were in the sixth form. They married two years later while at university and she converted to Islam. The marriage broke down and resulted in a divorce after seven years.

== Career ==
On GMTV, while discussing the controversy around comments made by Archbishop of Canterbury about shariah law and its implications on divorce, Heseltine said "I wanted the divorce, and it was a very simple process. It was actually a lot easier for me to get an Islamic divorce than the expensive, and somewhat time-consuming process through the English courts". She had assumed the name Hossein until her divorce.

== Personal life ==
On 9 August 2010, Heseltine married Muhammad Ali, a Bangladeshi who moved to Manchester with his family when he was three years old. By 2014, they had two children.

== Involvement with MPACUK ==
With her work at MPACUK, Heseltine was ranked by Time Out at position 17 in London's 100 top movers and shakers 2006.

Heseltine used to be a nursery teacher until elected as the CEO of MPACUK in 2010.

Heseltine joined MPACUK because she believed it would help in "empowering Muslims in mainstream politics and media, dealing with Islamophobia" and in campaigning against "discrimination against women in mosques, poverty and the situation in Palestine".
