= St George's Garrison Church, Woolwich =

Coordinates: 51.4854°N 0.0631°E

St George's Garrison Church
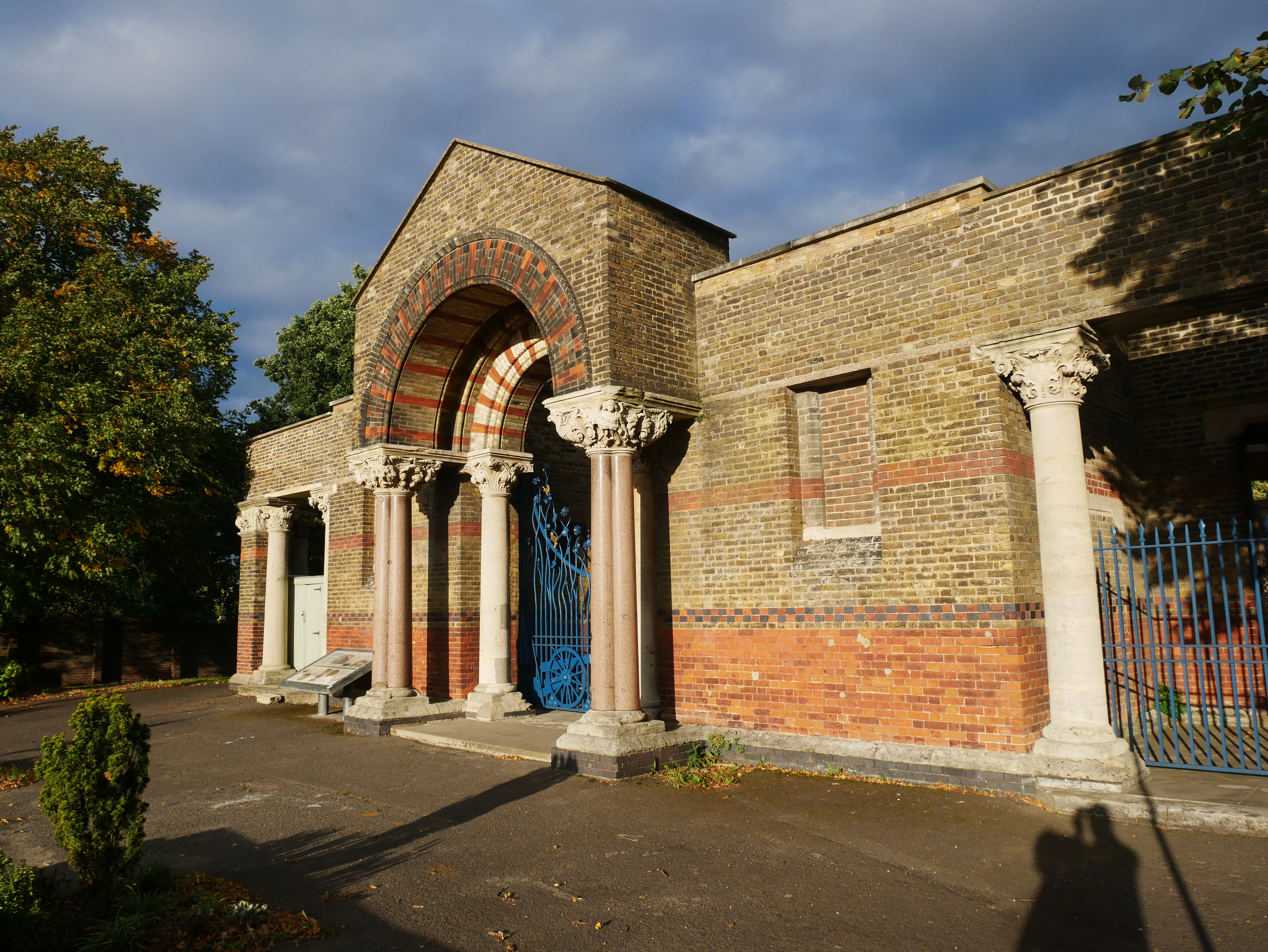
- View from Woolwich New Road

- Location within the Royal Borough of Greenwich
- OS grid reference: TQ4334678286
- Location: Woolwich, London
- Country: England
- Denomination: Church of England
- Website: stgeorgeswoolwich.org

History
- Status: Ruined church
- Founder: Sidney Herbert, 1st Baron Herbert of Lea
- Dedication: Saint George

Architecture
- Functional status: War memorial
- Heritage designation: Grade II
- Designated: 8 June 1973
- Architect: Thomas Henry Wyatt (assisted by Matthew Digby Wyatt)
- Style: Romanesque-Byzantine Revival
- Completed: 1863
- Closed: 14 July 1944 (hit by bomb)

St George's Garrison Church is a ruined church in Woolwich in the Royal Borough of Greenwich, South East London. It was built in 1862-63 as a Church of England place of worship for the Woolwich Royal Artillery garrison. The church was hit by a V-1 flying bomb in 1944 and largely destroyed by fire. The restored ruin with its canopied roof, its blue, red and yellow brick walls, its mosaics and a memorial garden is open to the public on Sundays.

== Location ==
The church was built on a triangular plot between Grand Depot Road (part of the A205 or South Circular Road) and Woolwich New Road, its entrance facing the parade ground of the Royal Artillery Barracks on Grand Depot Road. It is surrounded by a small park. On the south side of this park, where the two roads converge, stands the Second Boer War memorial. Both the church and the memorial are part of Woolwich Common conservation area.

== History ==
=== Construction and embellishment ===
The first chapel for the Royal Artillery was part of the Royal Artillery Barracks complex at the north end of Woolwich Common. It was built in 1808 and after St George's was built it was converted into a theatre.

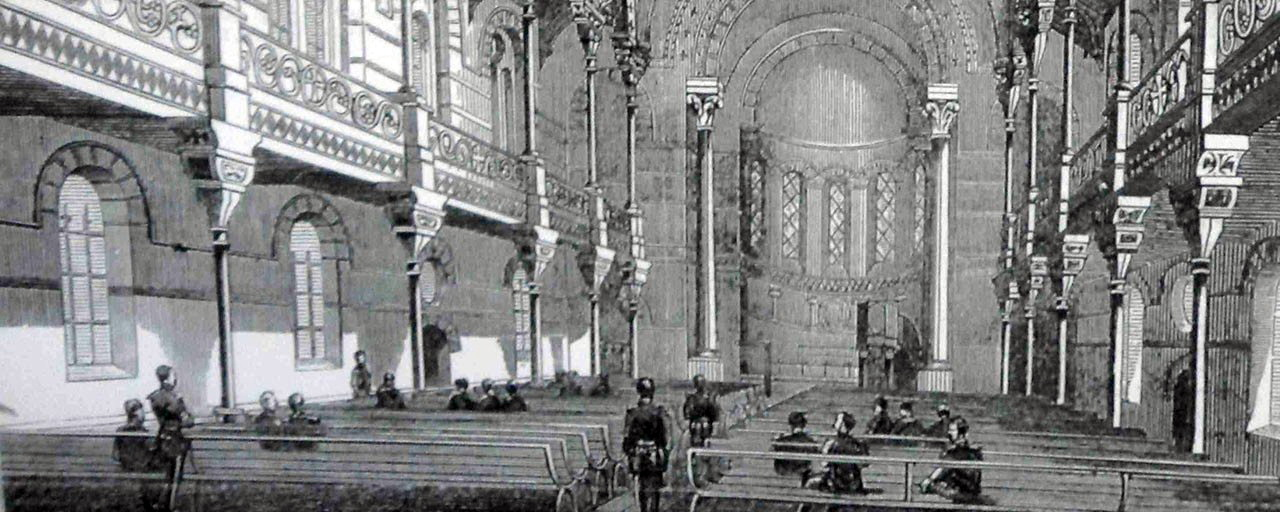
Church interior in The Illustrated London News, 1863?

The idea for building a new garrison church came from Lord Sidney Herbert, the Secretary of State for War. The design of the church is similar to that of T.H. Wyatt's parish church in Wilton, close to the Herbert family seat at Wilton House. Lord Herbert no doubt influenced the choice of style and the architect. In Woolwich, Wyatt was assisted by his younger brother Matthew. The choice of the Wyatt brothers may also have been influenced by the fact that both the nearby Royal Artillery Barracks and the Royal Military Academy had been designed by their great-great grandfather James Wyatt. The Wyatt brothers designed a church in the Early Christian/Lombardic Romanesque style with Byzantine influences in the interior. The church was built by the Pimlico builders George Smith and Co.

Soon after completion, seating capacity was increased from 1,550 to 1,700. Royal Artillery officers raised money for stained-glass windows and a church organ. Further embellishments consisted of mosaics (1902–03) and various memorials for deceased artillery men. South of the church an obelisk was erected to the memory of those who fell in the Second Boer War.

=== Destruction, disrepair and conservation ===
On 13 July 1944 a V-1 flying bomb hit the church and caused a fire which destroyed the interior. The walls were still more or less intact and a temporary roof was erected. The church however was no longer needed, as the smaller chapel of St Michael and All Angels at the Royal Military Academy proved to be a suitable replacement.

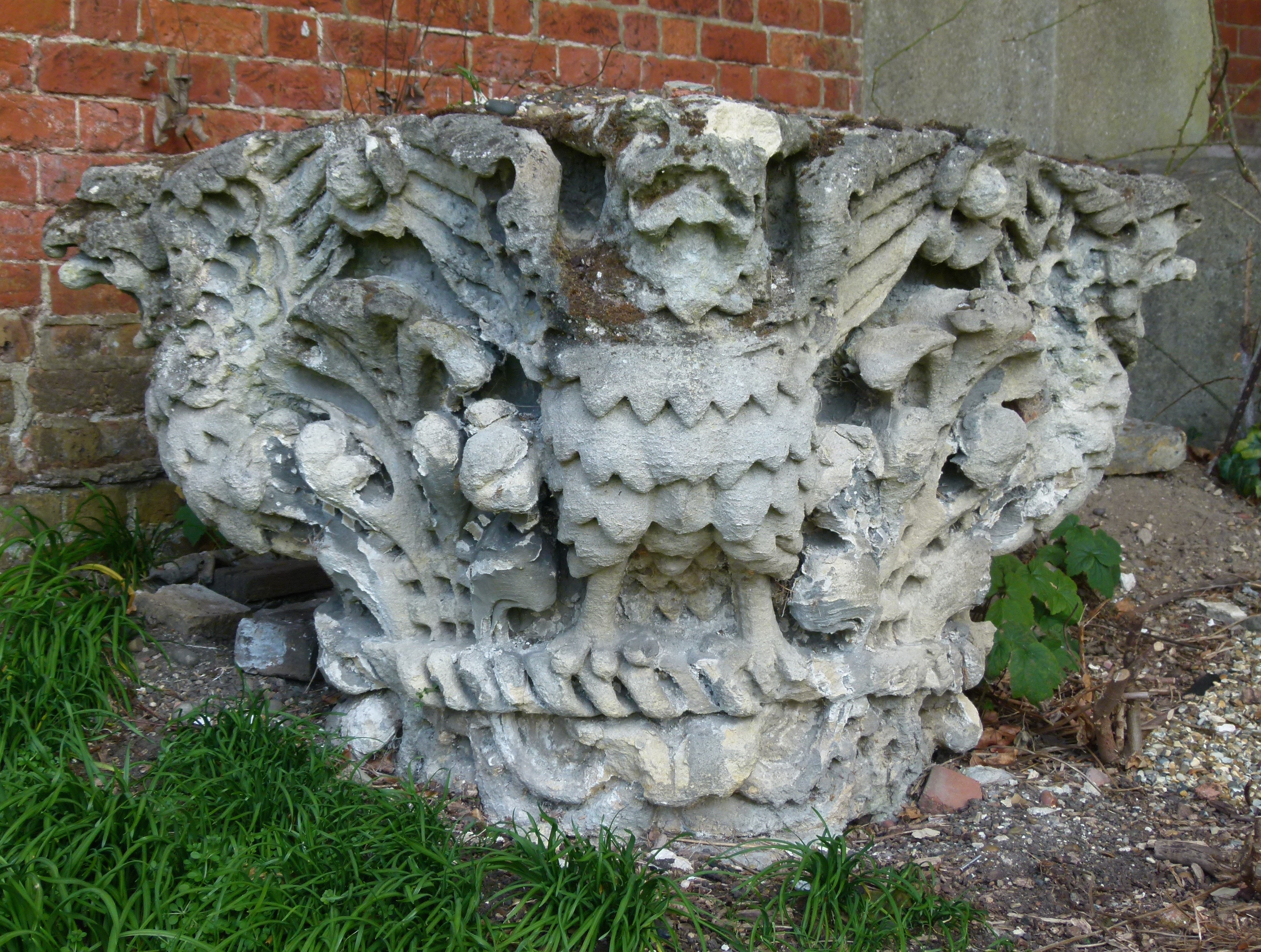
Single capital

After the war the burned-out church suffered from further neglect and vandalism. In 1952 a rebuilding scheme proposed by the architect Kenneth Lindy failed to gain sufficient support. In 1970 the upper parts of the walls were demolished and a corrugated canopy roof was erected to cover the remainder of the apse. Photos from the 1960s show that the apse windows were still in place then, as well as the upper parts of the columns supporting the chancel arch and parts of the pulpit. Also in 1970, a memorial garden was laid out in the roofless nave and aisles. In 1973 the building was listed for its architectural merits, especially its polychromatic Victorian brick, as well as being part of an historic military ensemble and for demonstrating the impact of an aerial assault, reflected in its ruinous state.

In 2011 ownership of the site was transferred from Defence Infrastructure Organisation to Heritage of London Trust Operations. Shortly afterwards the Heritage Lottery Fund awarded a grant of just under £400,000, towards the total cost of £800,000, for much needed conservation work, including the building of a larger canopy roof over the east end of the church. Since 2016 the church has been run by a local group, the Woolwich Garrison Church Trust. Further plans entail restoration of the pulpit and reinstallment of alabaster panels in the apse, which have been kept in storage.

== Architecture ==
=== Exterior ===
The church's exterior mainly follows the style of the Romanesque Revival. The use of polychromatic brick is typical of the mid-Victorian period. The narthex at the west end was inspired by Romanesque churches in Northern Italy and consists of three porches with Bath stone columns and carved capitals. The two western columns of the central porch are quatrefoil-shaped and of Aberdeen granite. The original west façade had a rose window and was about four times higher than the remaining part of the narthex. The church was designed as a large basilica with a wide nave and narrow aisles, of which almost nothing remains. The church never had a tower, just a small belfry on the roof of the south aisle, looking slightly out of place. The lower parts of the apse and the east ends of the aisles are reasonably well-preserved.

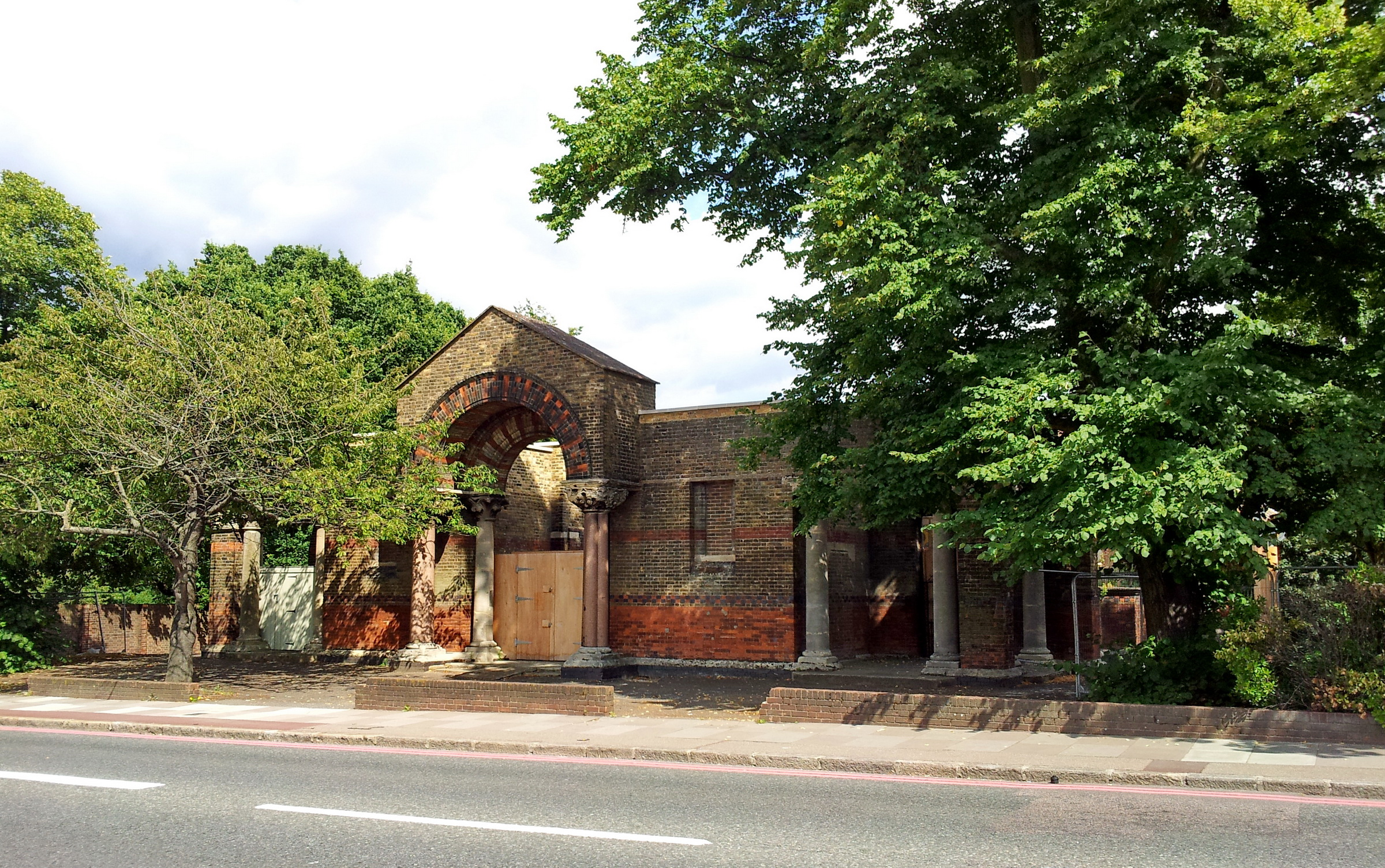
West façade

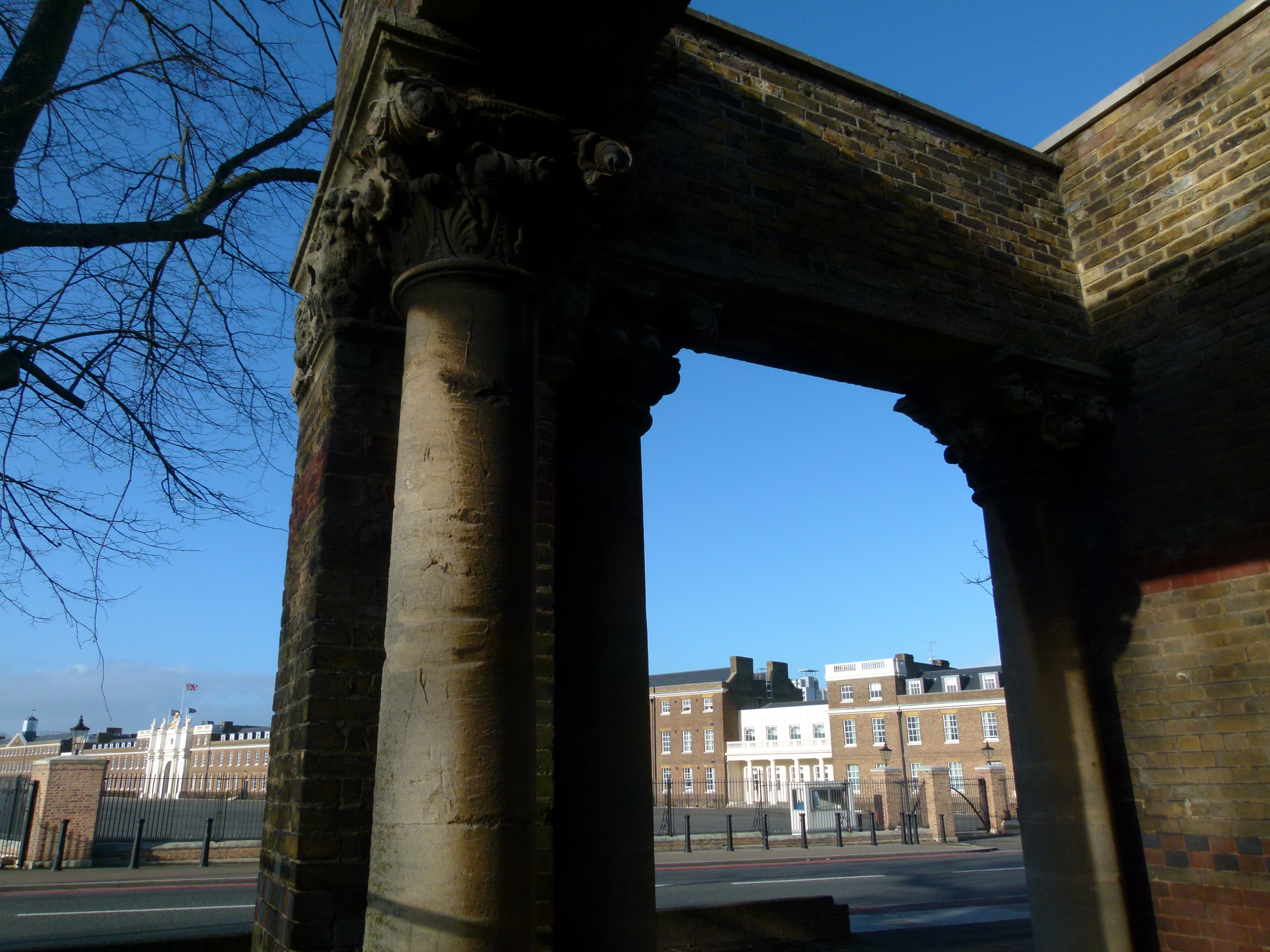
Detail of narthex, barracks in background

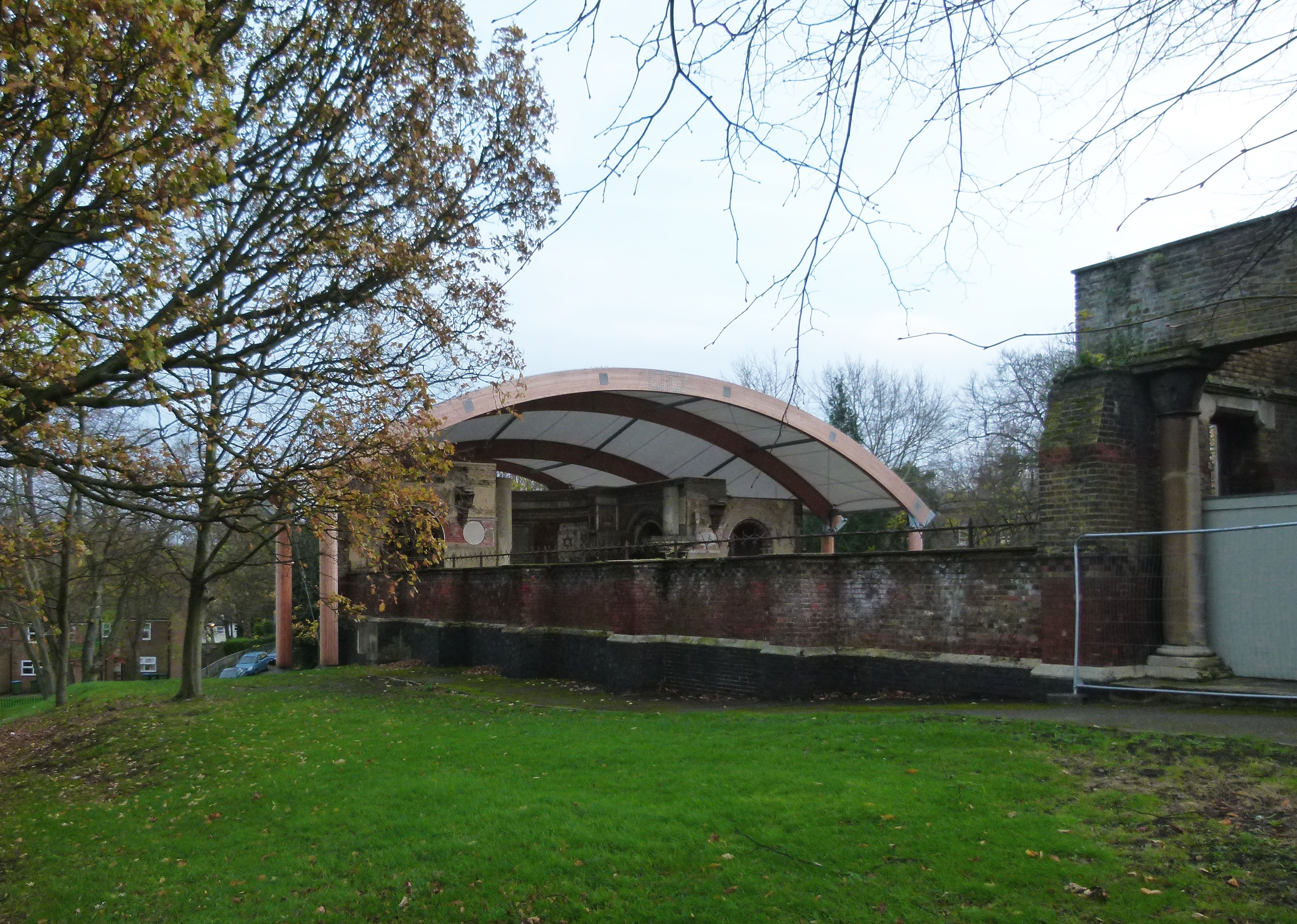
From the north west

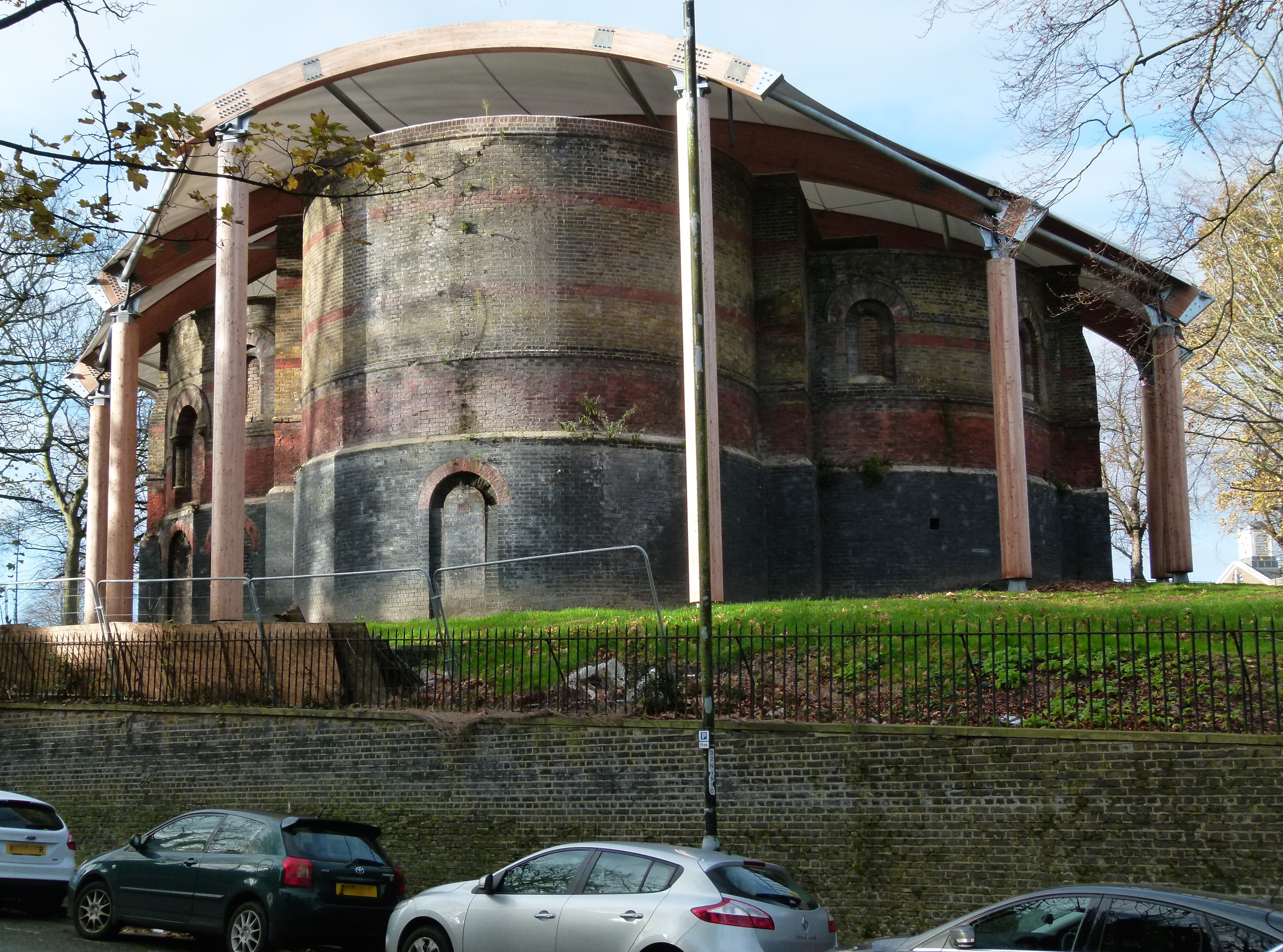
From the east

=== Interior ===
The interior of the church combines the neo-Romanesque and neo-Byzantine style. Most of it was lost in the fire or by neglect, but the lower parts of the chancel remain impressive. In the chancel various architectural details, mosaics (see below) and commemorative plaques are present, as well as the original altar and the lower part of the pulpit. Of the once impressive use of iron in the galleried interior almost nothing remains, except for two damaged corbels.

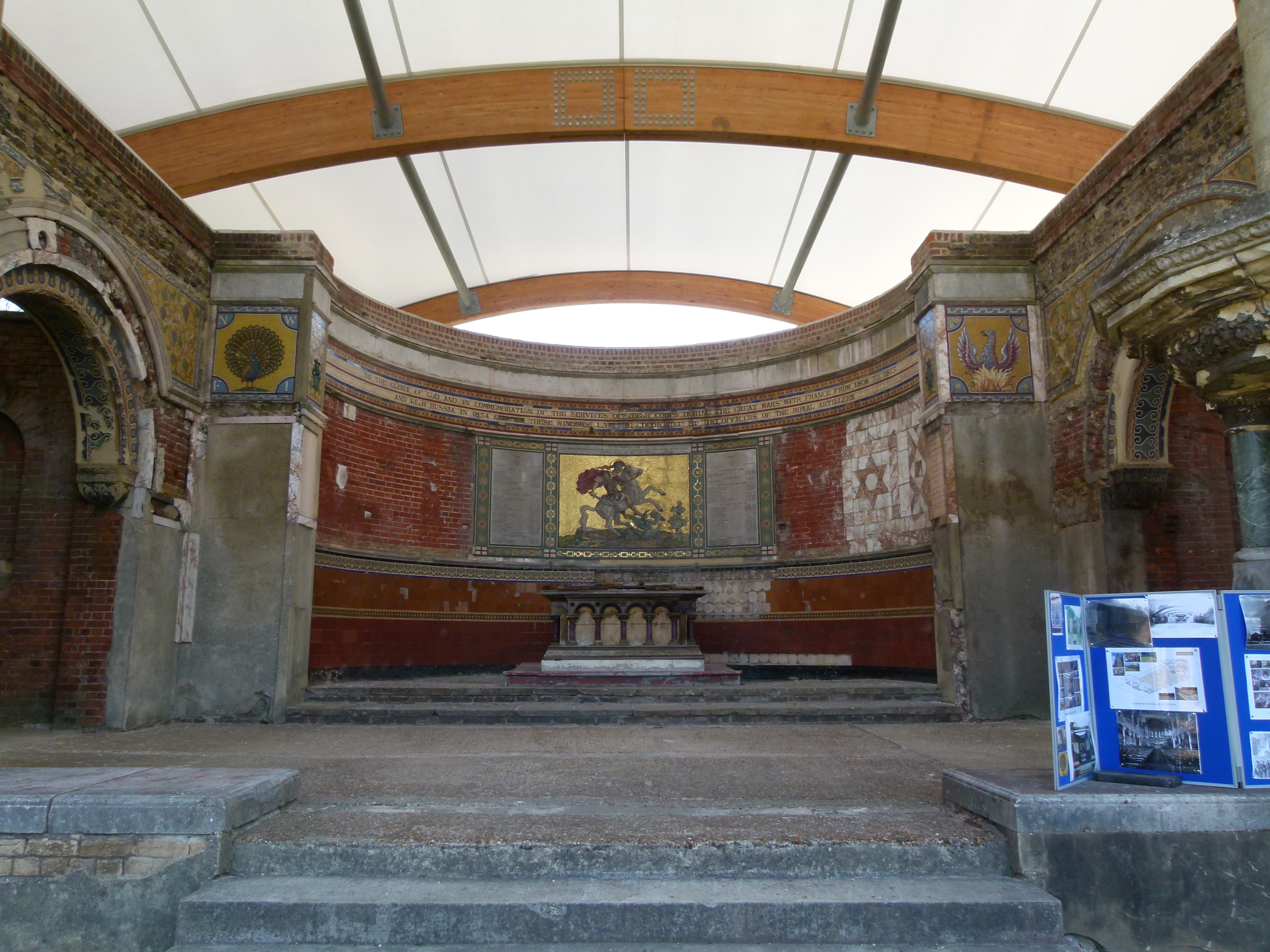
View of the apse

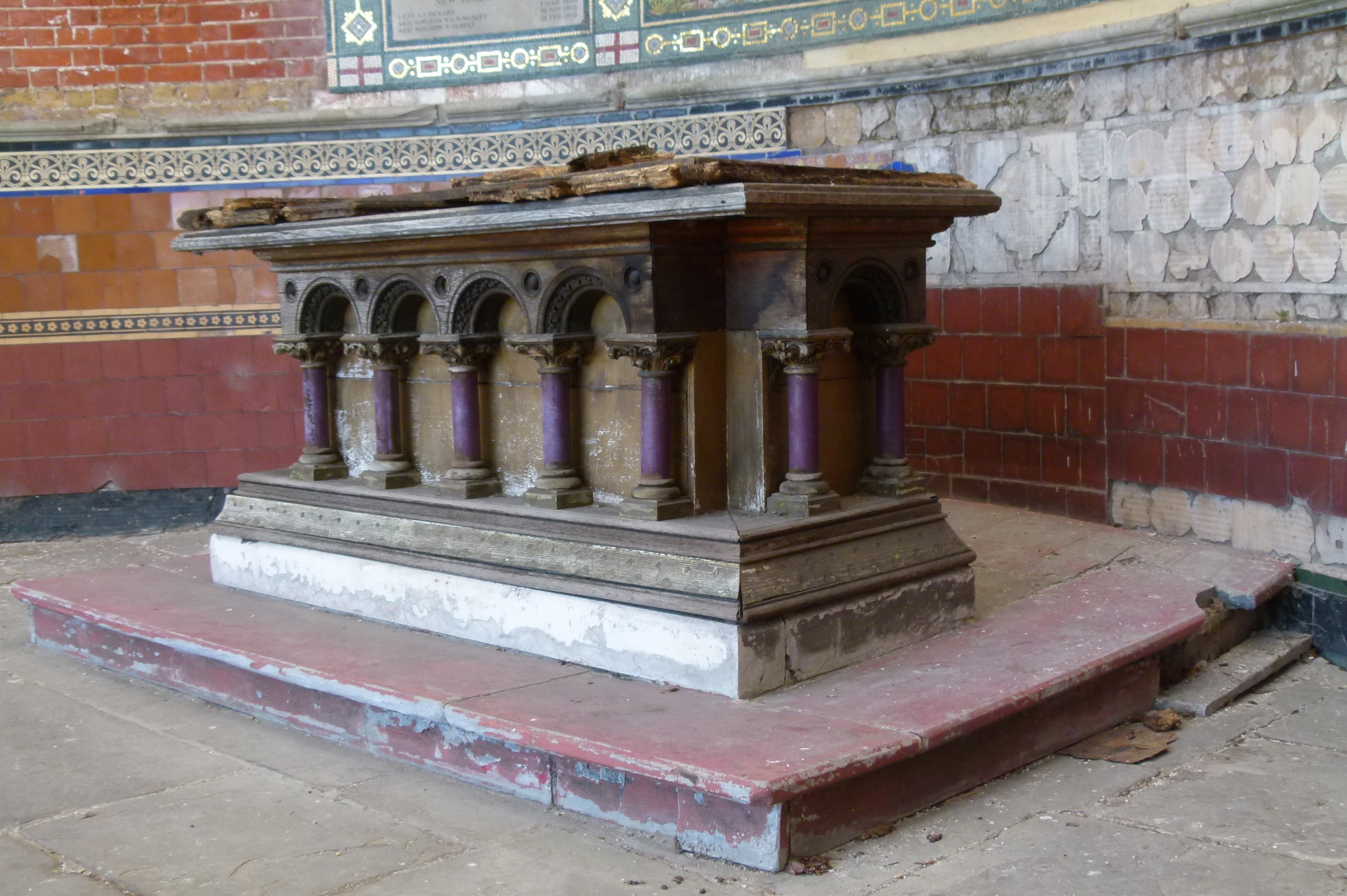
Romanesque altar

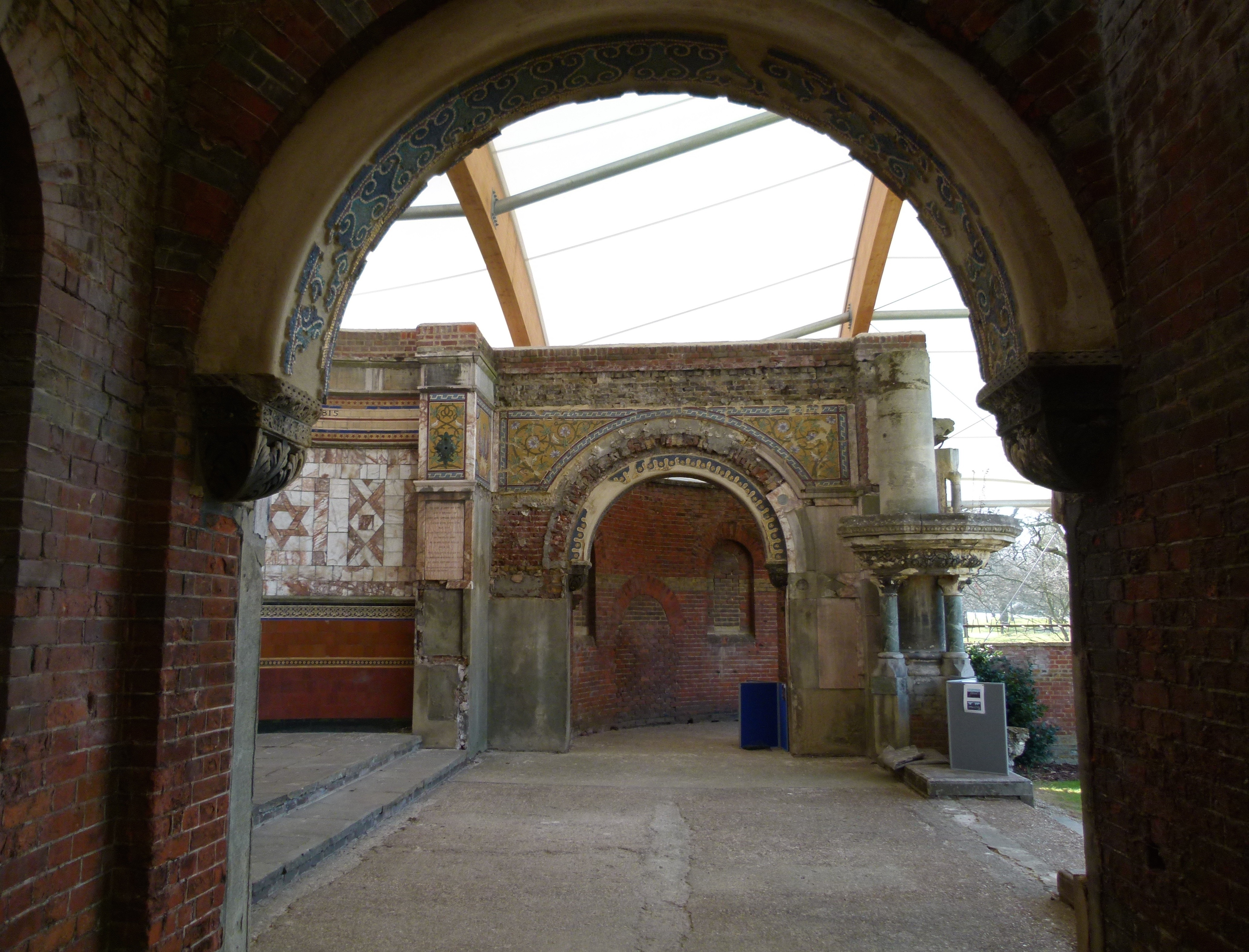
View towards the south

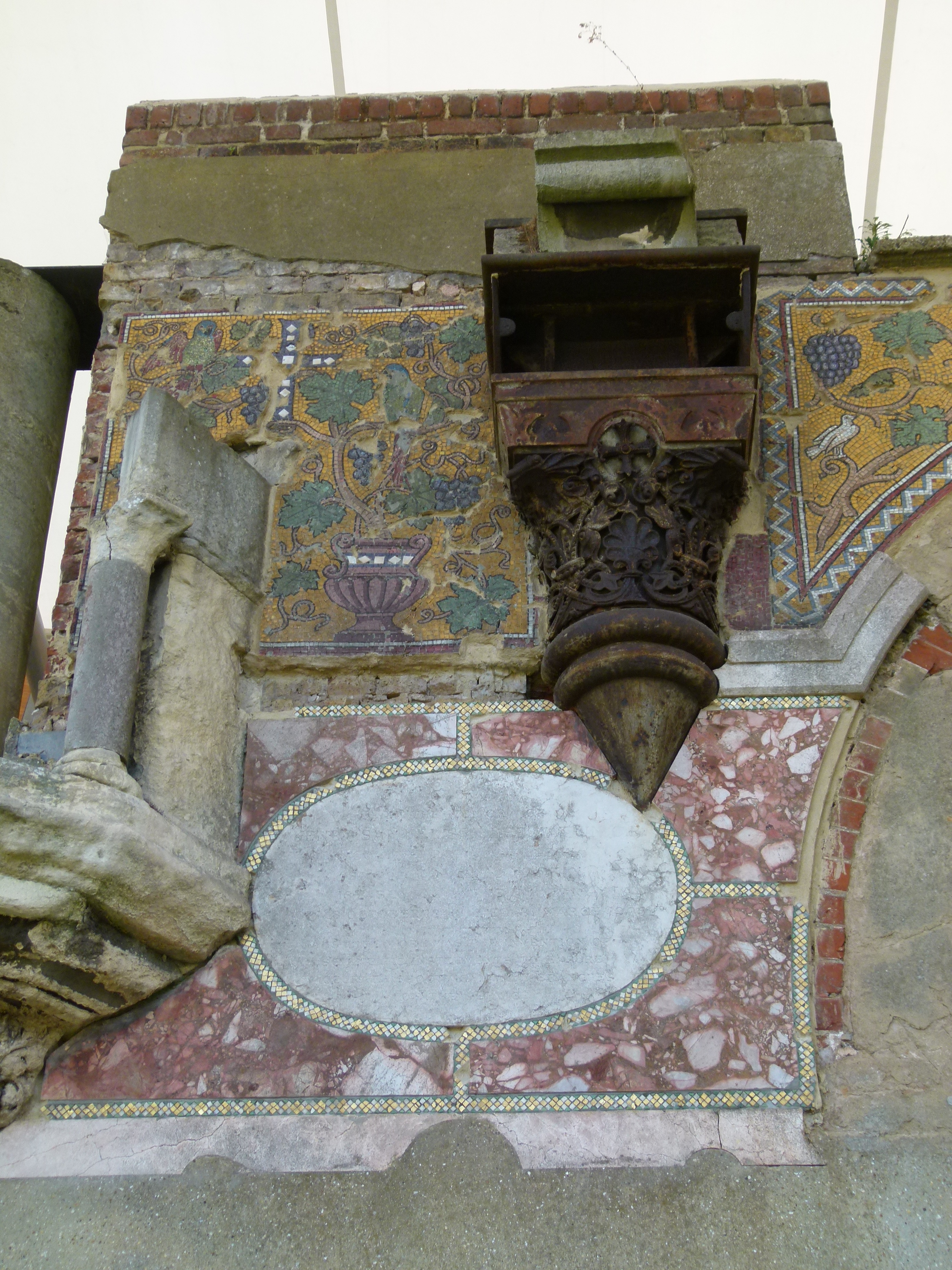
Cast-iron corbel

=== Mosaics ===
The mosaics in the chancel were made in the Salviati workshop in Venice and installed by Burke & Co in 1902-03. The best-preserved panels show ancient Christian symbols such as vines with grapes, a peacock and a phoenix rising from the flames. A small mosaic of the Lamb of God was saved from the rubble and survives in one of the toilets in the north-west porch. The largest mosaic is a representation of Saint George and the Dragon in the apse. This is a slightly later addition of 1919-20, being part of a memorial to Royal Artillery men who had received the Victoria Cross.

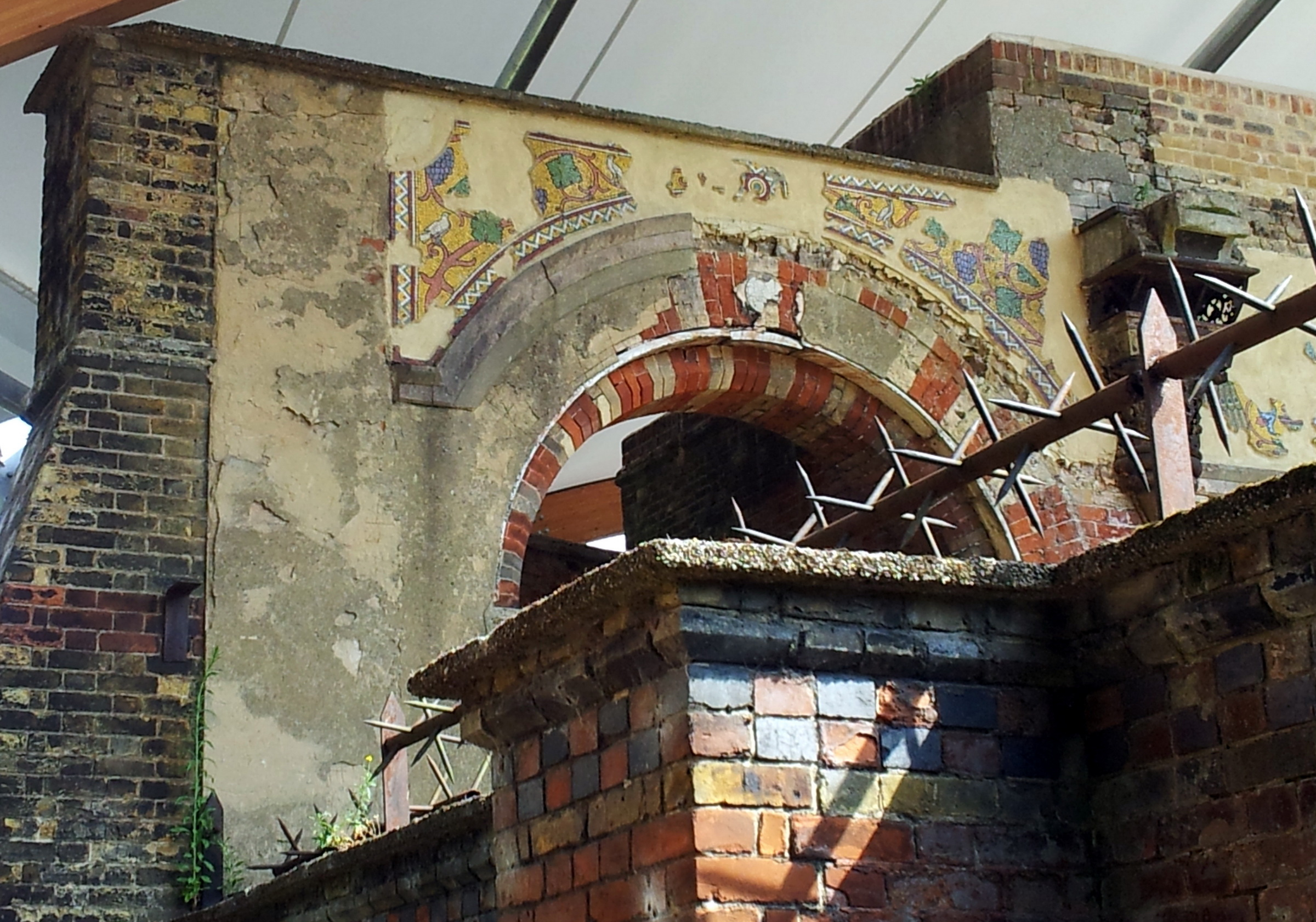
Arch with damaged mosaics

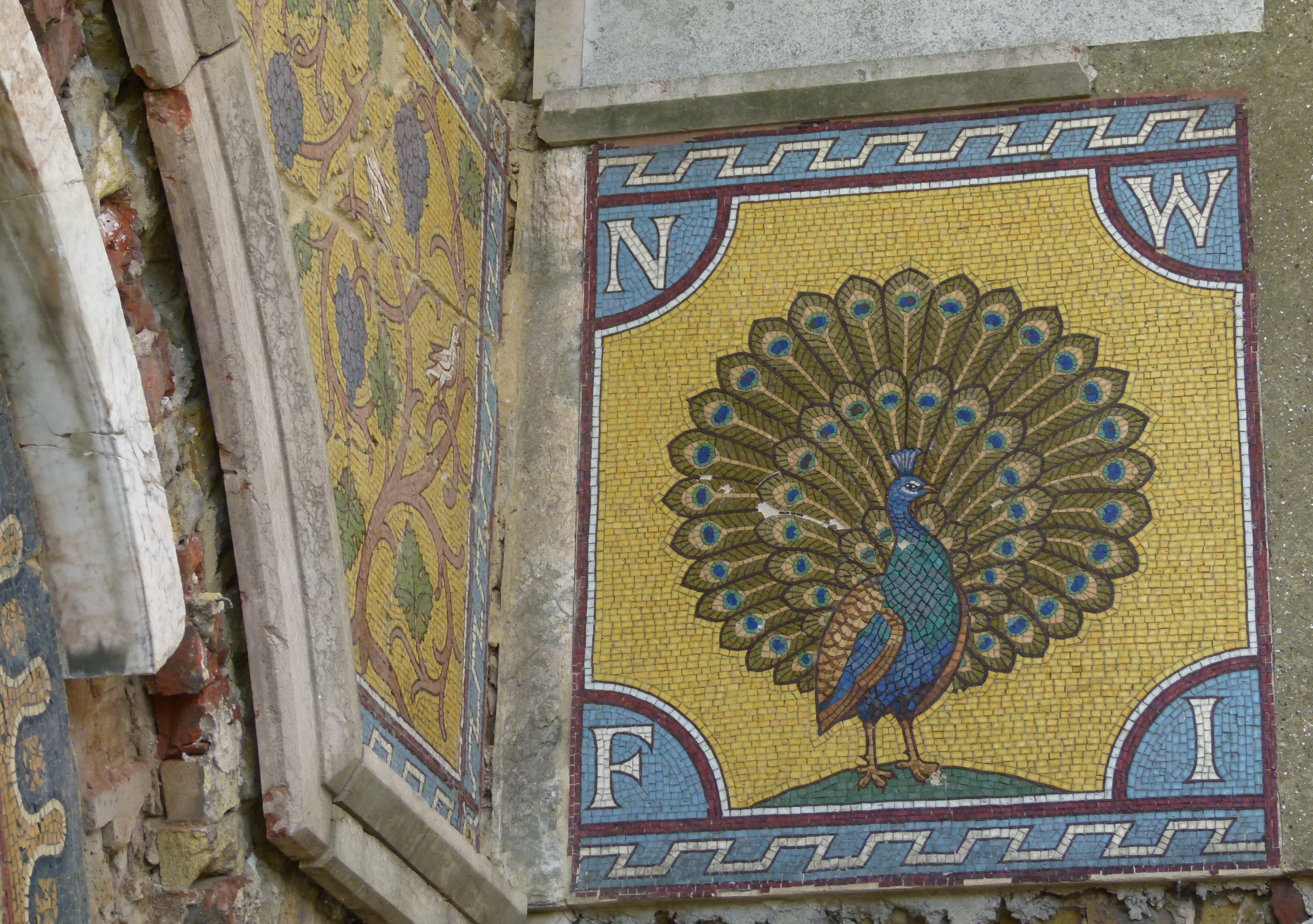
Vine and peacock

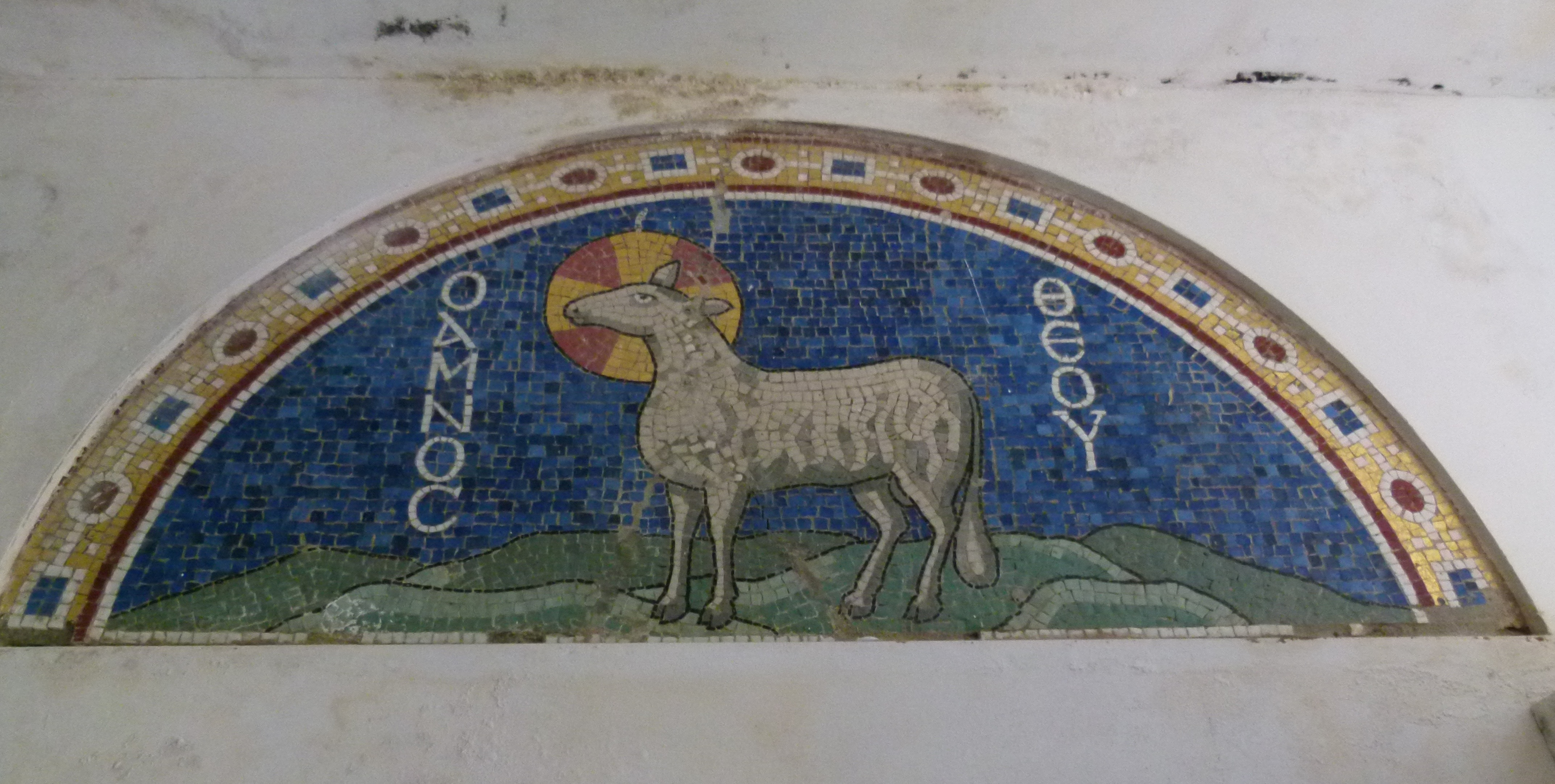
Holy Lamb of God

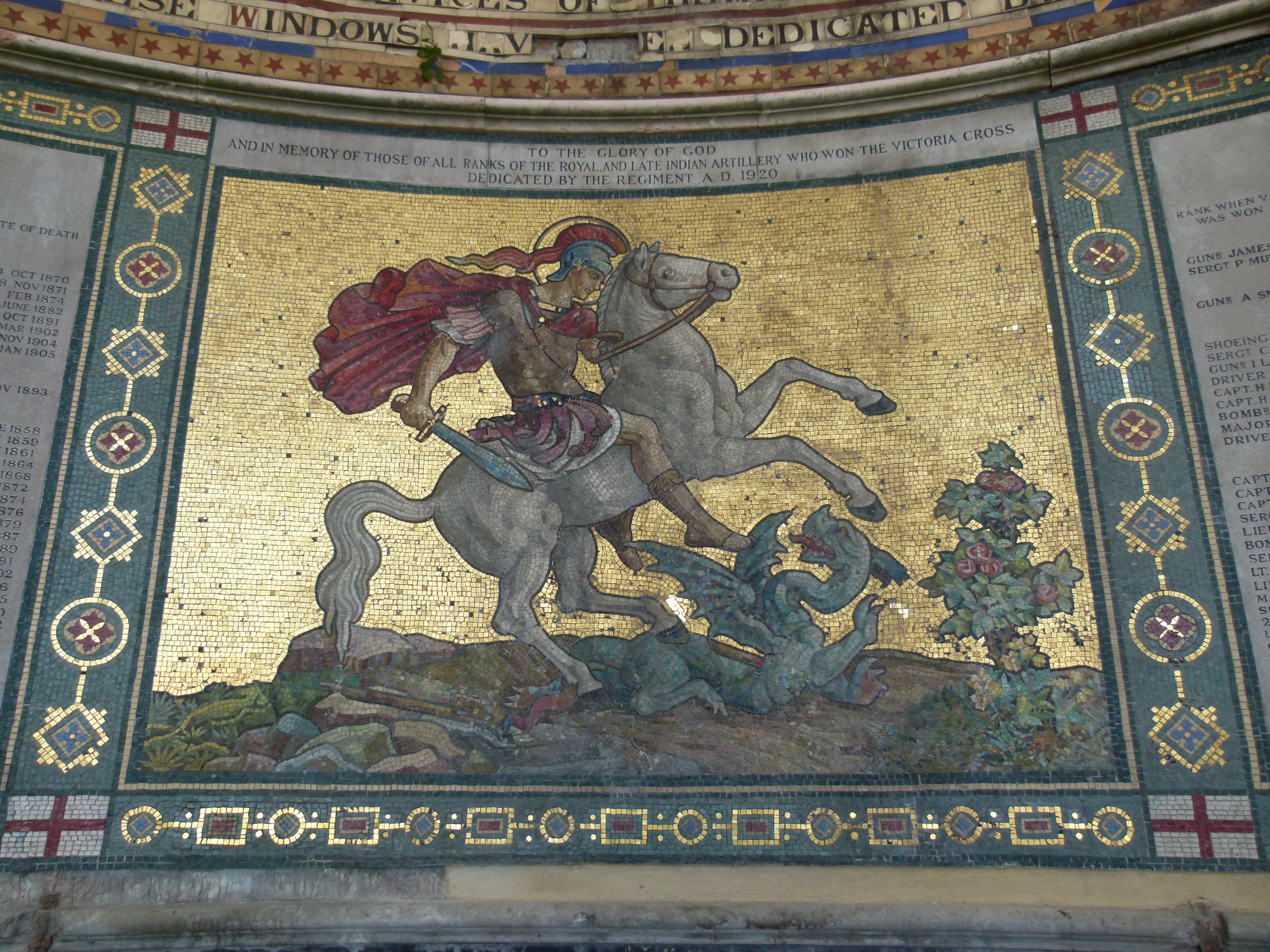
St George and the Dragon

== Memorial site ==
St George's has been a memorial church for more than a century. As well as the Victoria Cross memorial, several marble plaques commemorating artillery men survive in the apse. One of the columns supporting the arch that separates the chancel and the nave also bears the names of men killed in military conflict up till the Second World War.

A plaque inside the church commemorates the designation of the church as a memorial garden, following the V1 flying bomb destruction in July 1944.

The memorial garden was first laid out as a lawn in 1970. On the south and north aisle walls, copper plaques are attached with the names of Royal Artillery men killed in action or of natural causes after World War II. On 11 November 2015 a memorial was added by the Royal Borough of Greenwich marking Woolwich's history as a barracks town and commemorating the men and women who served or lived in Woolwich and gave their lives in the service of their country. Included are the names of the victims of the IRA-bombing of the King's Arms in 1974, and fusilier Lee Rigby, who was murdered by Islamic terrorists in Woolwich in 2013.

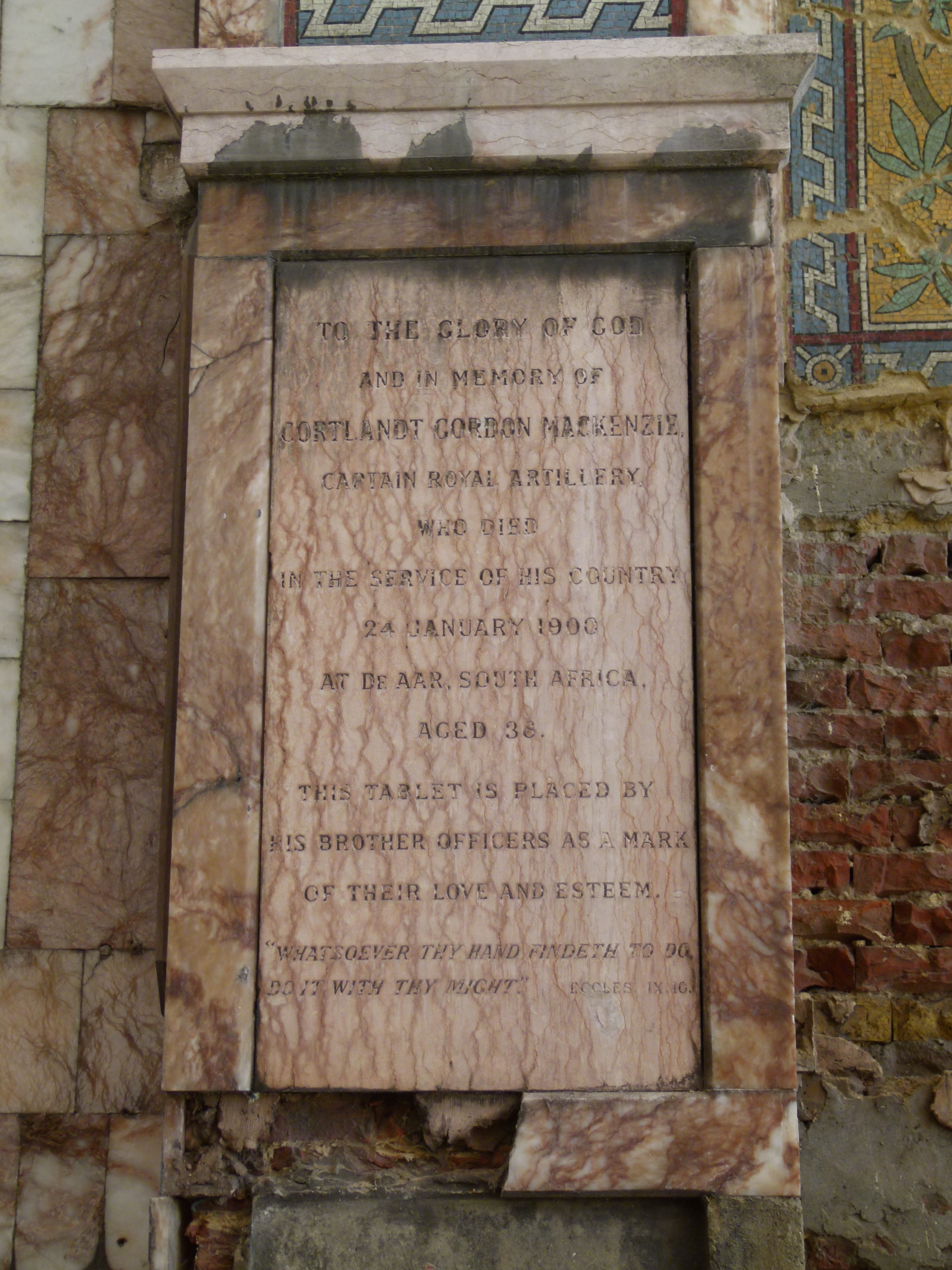
Memorial plaque of Royal Artillery captain († 1900)

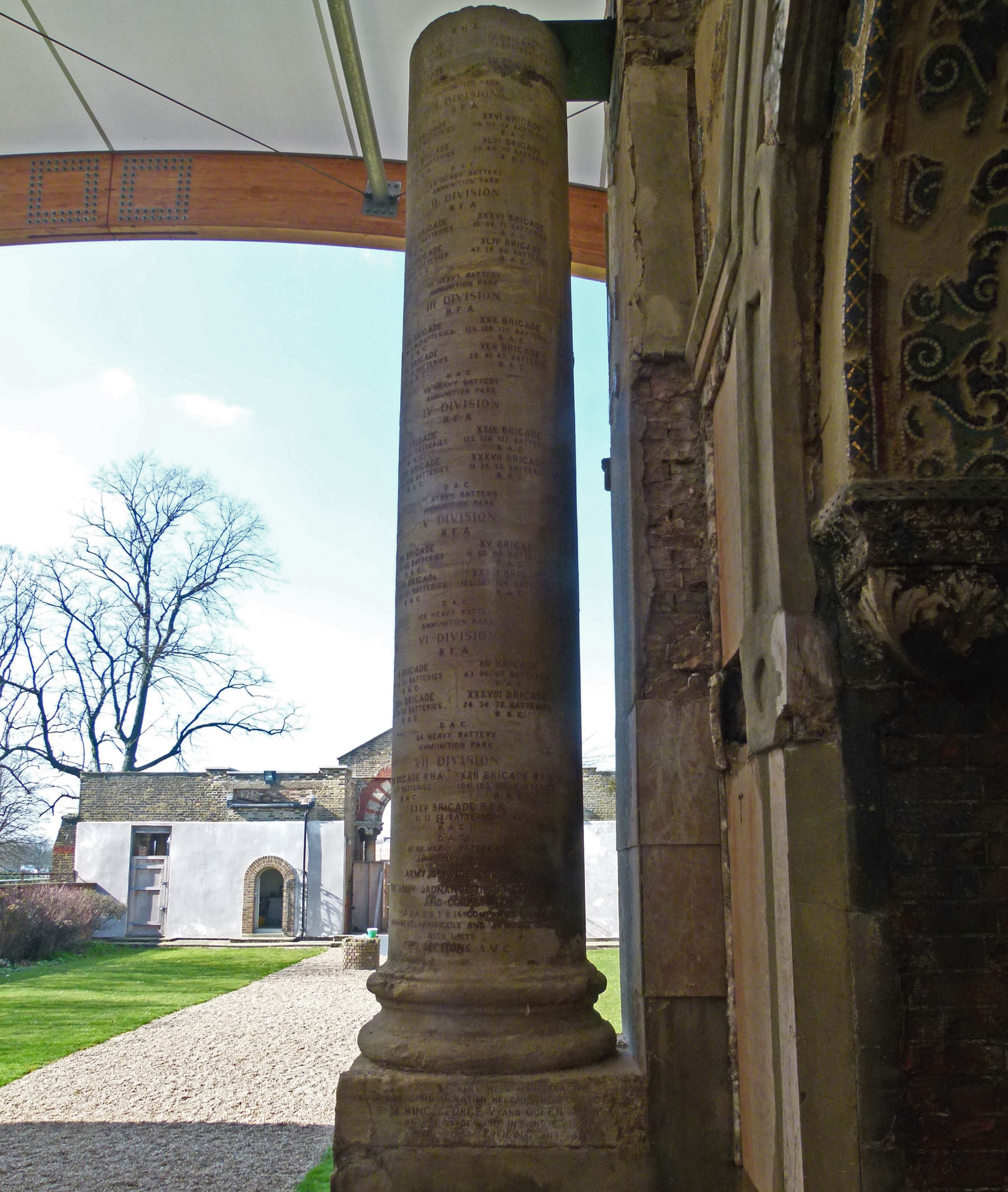
Inscribed column and garden towards the west

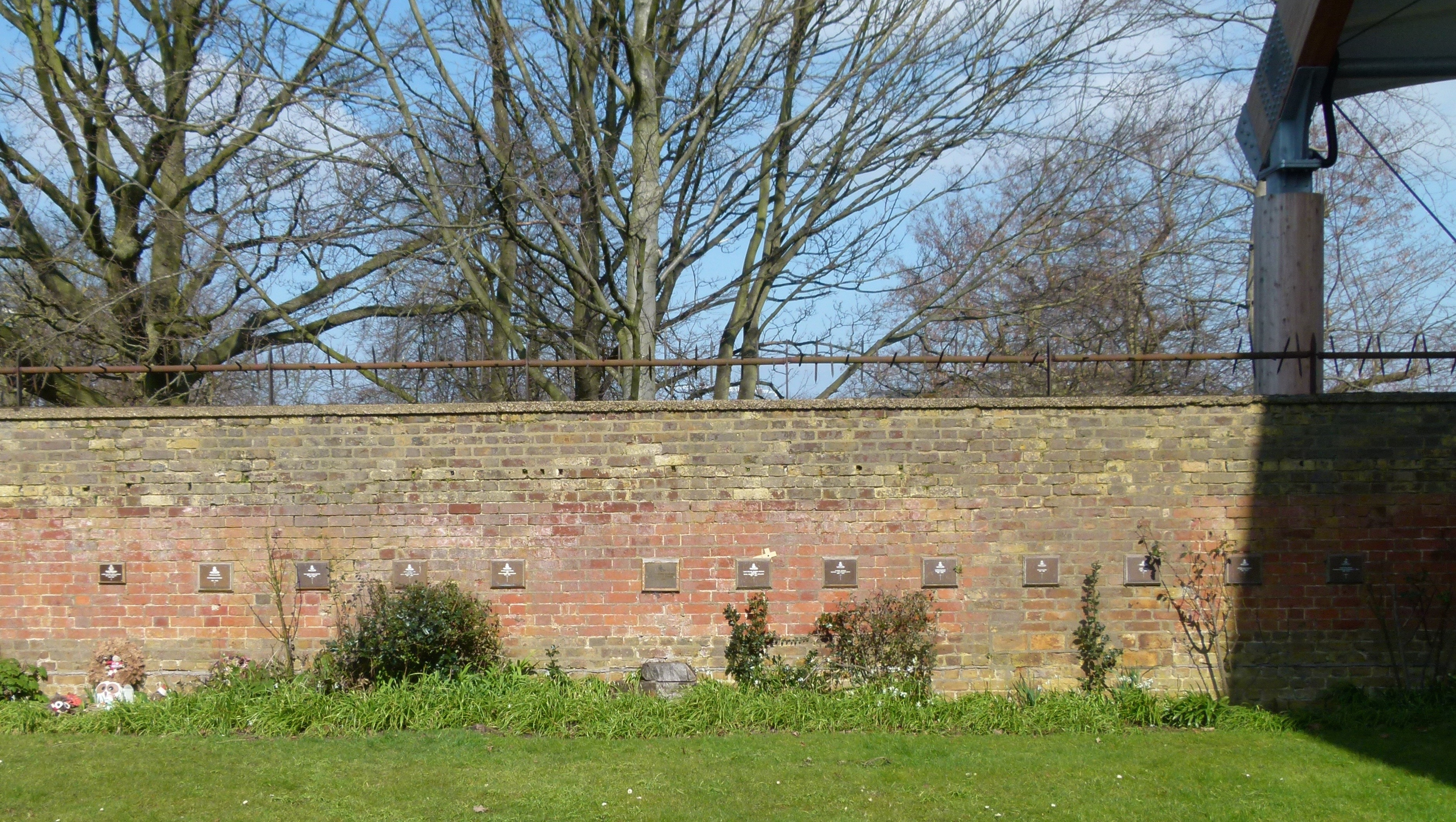
Memorial wall for Royal Artillery veterans post-World War II

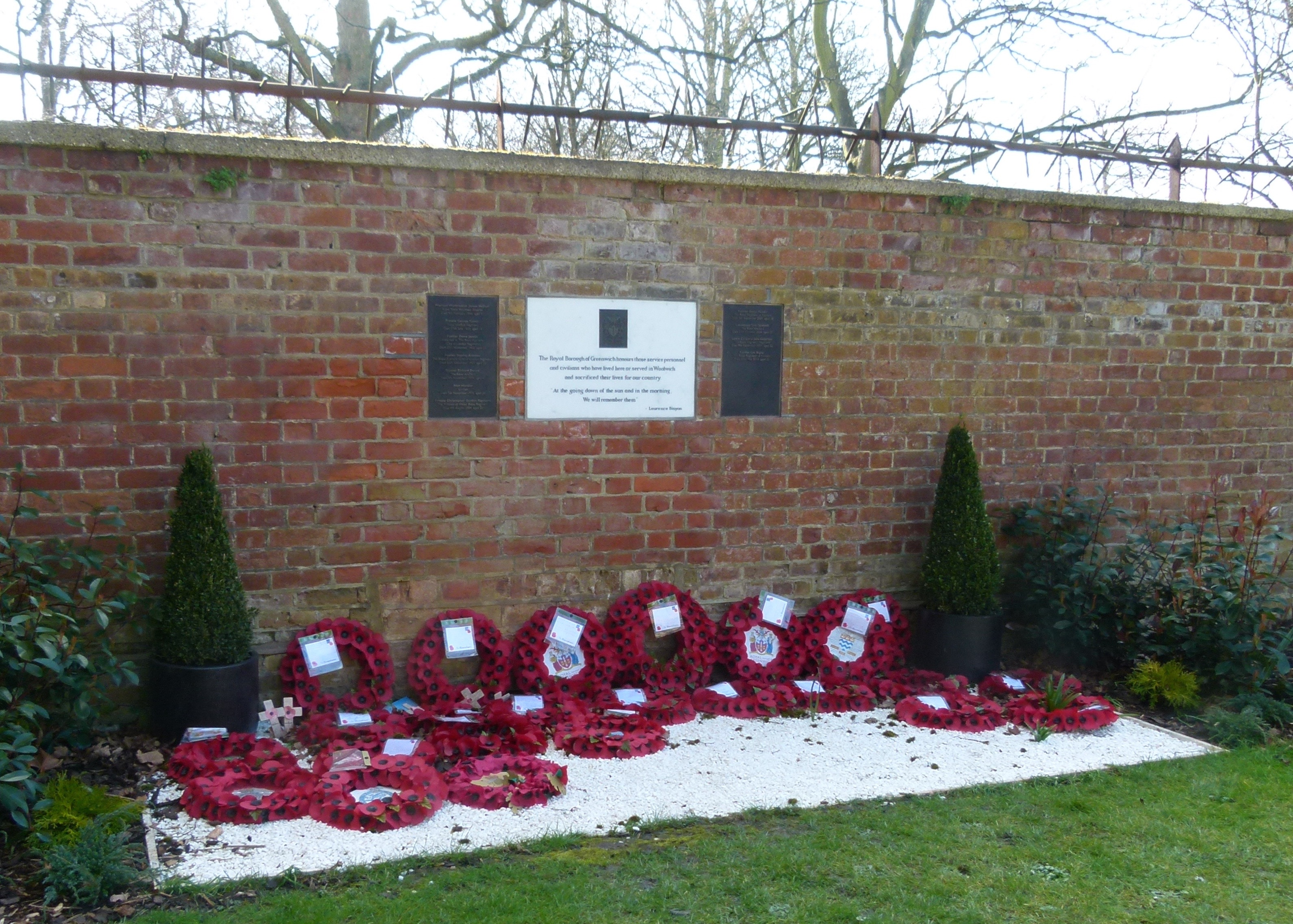
Memorial for Lee Rigby and others who died in service

== See also ==
- Royal Artillery Barracks
- Woolwich Common – nearby conservation area
- St Peter's Roman Catholic Church, Woolwich – nearby listed church

== Bibliography ==
- Bedford, K., Woolwich through time, Amberley Publishing, 2014. ISBN 978 1 4456 1599 8
- Saint, A., Guillery, P. (ed.), Woolwich – Survey of London, Volume 48, Yale Books, London, 2012. ISBN 978 0 300 18722 9 (online text chapter 7; please note page numbers online do not correspond with the book)
