= Muslim Public Affairs Committee UK =

British Muslim political lobby group

- Founders: Asghar Bukhari; Zulfikar Bukhari; Tassadiq Rehman
- Key people: Catherine Heseltine (CEO)
- Website: MPACUK.org

The Muslim Public Affairs Committee UK (MPACUK) is a London-based British Muslim lobby and civil liberties group, founded to address what it perceives as the under-representation of Muslims in British politics. The organisation is active primarily in electoral campaigns and media appearances.

== Aims and policies ==
MPACUK encourages Muslims to participate in tactical voting against MPs who support policies which it considers not to be in Muslims' interest. This can extend both to national issues such as civil liberties, Islamophobia and anti-terror legislation; and to foreign policy, including the 2003 invasion of Iraq, Israel-Palestine conflict and the 2006 Lebanon War.

The group describes its activities as guided by four overarching principles: Reviving the fard (obligation) of Jihad, Anti-Zionism, institutional revival, and accountability.

== History ==
The group was originally set up as a web-based media monitoring group.

== Campaigns ==
In July 2011, MPACUK launched the Stop Islamophobia Week campaign due to the rise in anti-Muslim hate crimes. This was a campaign aimed at raising awareness of Islamophobia and encouraging Muslims to do something constructive in response. Particular focus was given to the Srebrenica massacre which was commemorated by a vigil outside the embassy of Bosnia and Herzegovina.

In July 2012, MPACUK continued Stop Islamophobia Week.

== Involvement in elections ==
=== 2005 ===
Labour MP Lorna Fitzsimons became the target of an MPACUK campaign when she stood for re-election at the 2005 general election in the constituency of Rochdale, which has a significant Muslim population. The All-Party Parliamentary Report noted with concern MPACUK's campaign against Lorna Fitzsimons and that leaflets had been printed by MPACUK, which claimed that Fitzsimons had done nothing to help the Palestinians because she was a Jewish member of the Labour Friends of Israel. Fitzsimons, who was a member of the Labour Friends of Israel, is not in fact Jewish. MPACUK later apologised for the inaccurate description.

MPACUK was described by Jack Straw as "most egregious" after it actively campaigned for Muslims in his Blackburn constituency to vote tactically against him in the same election.

=== 2010 ===
MPACUK was involved in campaigning to unseat six MPs in England. MPACUK was active in the Oldham campaign, and according to the BBC, "urged Muslim voters to help unseat Phil Woolas, and targeted several other Labour MPs, who MPAC judged to have pro-Israeli positions and who supported the war in Iraq." Woolas stated, "There was vehement anti-semitism going on in the area, canvassing amongst the Asian population in the area saying: don't vote for the Jew. As it happens, I'm not Jewish but the fact my son's Christian name is a Jewish name was used against me." MPACUK denied responsibility for the rumours.

The same year, MPACUK campaigned to remove Andrew Dismore from office, stating he was someone "who backed the Iraq War and has a long record of Islamophobia", and claimed responsibility for his defeat.

=== 2011 ===
In 2011 a campaign to encourage Muslims in Britain to vote YES in the UK was launched in response to the Alternative Vote referendum.

=== 2019 ===
MPACUK encouraged voting for Labour, the Greens, the SNP or Plaid Cymru in the 2019 European Parliament election.

== Controversies ==
=== Allegations of antisemitism ===
In 2004, MPACUK was the subject of a no-platform order by the National Union of Students, because of its publication of antisemitic and anti-Zionist conspiracy theories, provocative racist material, and further material on its website encouraging activists to break the law.

After Lorna Fitzsimons's defeat, in 2006, the Community Security Trust (CST) accused MPACUK of antisemitism. An All-Party Parliamentary Inquiry into antisemitism observed that MPACUK was criticised by the CST for promoting the idea of a worldwide Zionist conspiracy and using material taken from neo-Nazi, white nationalist, and Holocaust denial websites. The report also noted the CST's assertion that "use of 'Zionist' as a replacement for 'Jewish' is common on the MPACUK website", citing the case in which MPACUK's website described the Talmud as a "Zionist holy book" (notwithstanding the fact the Talmud had been written centuries before the concept of Zionism), and that MPACUK has articulated antisemitic conspiracy theories through the language of anti-Zionism.

The group was also accused of antisemitism for writing on their Facebook page "Take your holocaust, roll it nice and tight and shove it up your (be creative)!".

One of the group's founding members, Asghar Bukhari, was accused of making donations to the writer and Holocaust denier David Irving and asked other websites to donate to him. MPACUK responded by saying it was part of a smear campaign and was a "classic tactic by the Zionist lobby", and that the donation was made before the organisation existed. Bukhari said on Facebook "Muslims who fight against the occupation of their lands are 'Mujahadeen' and are blessed by Allah. And any Muslim who fights and dies against Israel and dies is a martyr and will be granted paradise. ... There is no greater oppressor on this earth than the Zionists, who murder little children for sport."

Bukhari has stated that "MPAC is a volunteer organization. We are highly anti-Zionist and are not afraid to say it. It is a good thing."

Maajid Nawaz, a former radical Islamist turned liberal activist and chairman of the anti-extremist foundation Quilliam, said in an interview with the BBC that there is an unhealthy antisemitic strand to MPAC's thinking. People who disagree with MPACUK or criticize them are described as "pro-Zionist stooges, or neoconservatives, or Uncle Toms."

== Lobbying ==
=== 2006 ===
MPACUK and others sent an open letter with Birmingham Civic Society (2006) in protest to the MP Enoch Powell being honoured in a memorial plaque. A response was received from the Chairman of the society, Dr Freddie Gick, who replied with “I would be grateful if you could reassure members of the community that....as long as I remain Chairman of this Society, no such suggestion [as to honour Enoch Powell] would ever be given any serious consideration.” .

=== 2005 ===
MPACUK launched a campaign against Oxfam for collaborating and trading with Starbucks who were accused of supporting Israel. The campaign came to an end when Oxfam announced they would be ceasing trade with Starbucks.

MPACUK launched a campaign against Satellite Graphics Ltd who printed the British National Party (BNP) magazine, The Voice of Freedom. Satellite Graphics Ltd are owned by Saudi Research and Marketing Company and after an online campaign, the Saudi Research and Marketing Company cut the funding of the BNP’s magazine.
