= Terrorism in the United Kingdom =

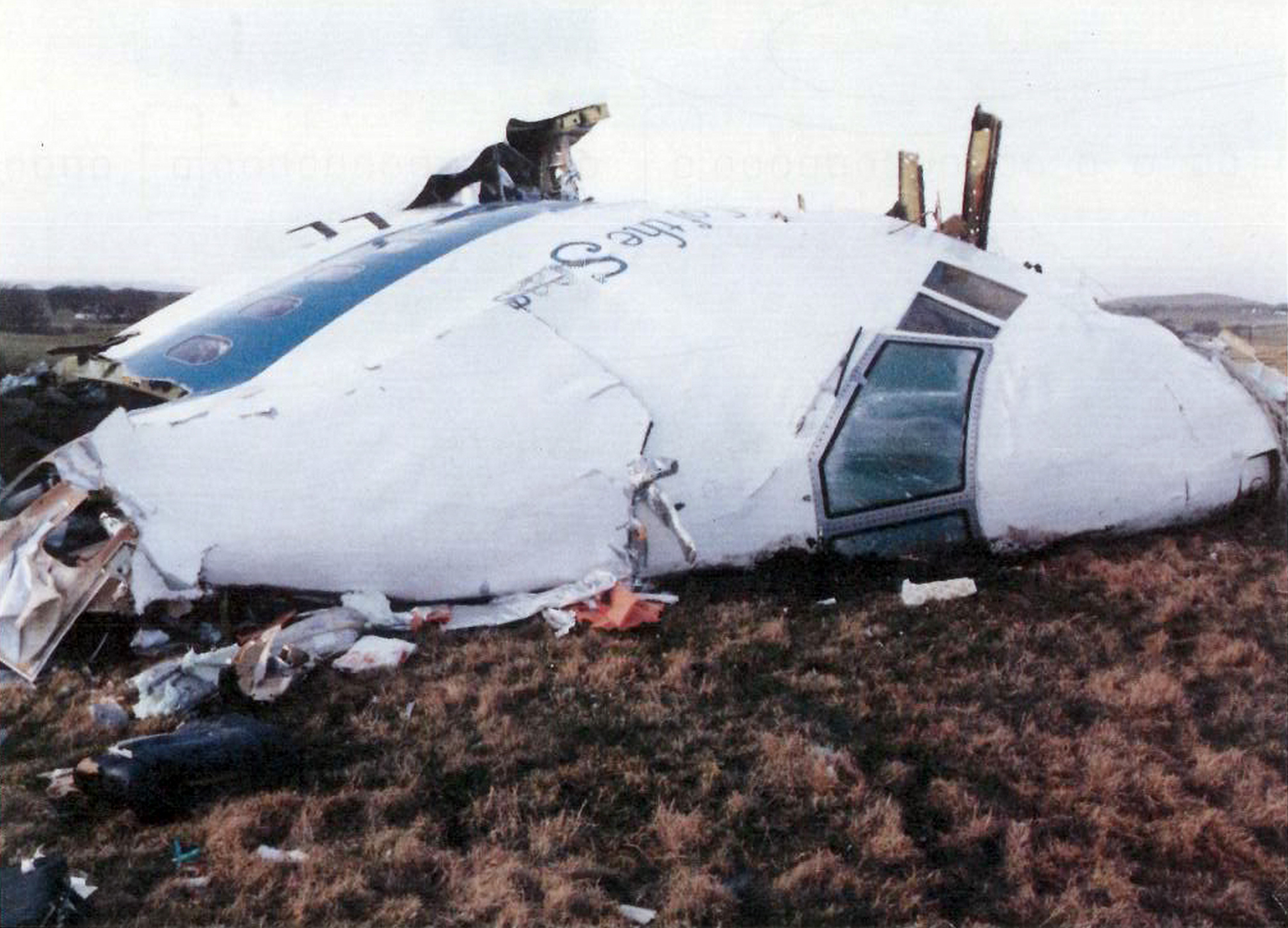
The aftermath of the bombing of Pan Am Flight 103, which killed 270 people. It was the deadliest terrorist attack in UK history.

Terrorist incidents map of the United Kingdom 1970–2015, with a total of 4,972 incidents plotted. Northern Ireland and London are major hotspots for incidents.

Terrorism in the United Kingdom, according to the Home Office, poses a significant threat to the state. There have been various causes of terrorism in the UK. Before the 2000s, most attacks were linked to the Northern Ireland conflict (the Troubles). In the late 20th century, there were also attacks by Islamic terrorist groups. Since 1970, there have been at least 3,395 terrorist-related deaths in the UK, the highest in Western Europe. The vast majority of the deaths were linked to the Northern Ireland conflict and happened in Northern Ireland. In mainland Great Britain, there were 430 terrorist-related deaths between 1971 and 2001. Of these, 125 deaths were linked to the Northern Ireland conflict, and 305 deaths were linked to other causes, including 270 in the Lockerbie bombing. Since 2001, there have been almost 100 terrorist-related deaths in Great Britain.

The UK’s CONTEST strategy aims to prevent terrorism and other forms of extremism. It places a responsibility on education and health bodies to report individuals who are deemed to be at risk of radicalisation. The 2023 CONTEST report indicated that 75 per cent of the Security Service (MI5)'s caseload was from monitoring Islamist threats. In 2023, 80% of the Counter Terrorism Police network’s live investigations were Islamist while 10% were extreme Right-Wing. In 2024, polling by YouGov found that half of the public in Great Britain believed that Islamic extremists were the biggest extremist threat. 76% considered Islamic extremists to be a “big” or “moderate" threat, although attitudes differed significantly along political lines.

1,834 people were arrested in the UK from September 2001 to December 2009 in connection with terrorism, of which 422 were charged with terrorism-related offences and 237 were convicted.

== History ==
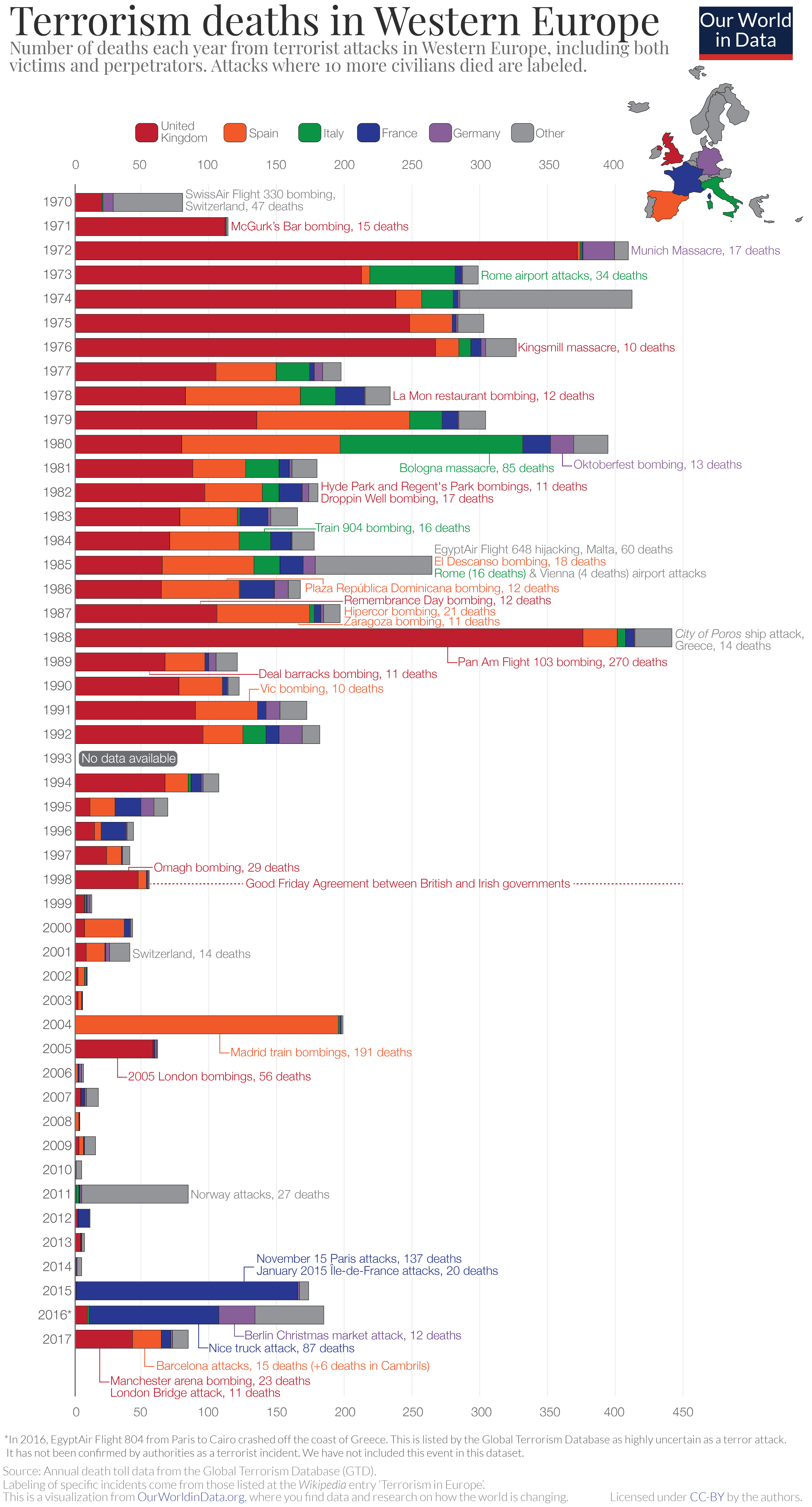
Terrorism deaths in Western Europe 1970-2017, based on the Global Terrorism Database. The UK is presented in red.

Terrorist incidents in United Kingdom
Year	Number of incidents	Deaths	Injuries
2017	122	42	301
2016	104	9	20
2015	115	1	23
2014	103	0	4
2013	137	4	64
2012	51	1	2
2011	47	1	3
2010	57	0	22
2009	22	3	12
2008	39	0	8
2007	20	4	13
2006	6	0	0
2005	25	57	836
2004	5	0	2
2003	23	2	11
2002	21	2	13
2001	94	8	33
2000	61	7	28
1999	76	7	161
1998	63	46	259
1997	78	23	35
1996	36	14	395
1995	22	11	5
1994	256	66	177
1993	7	31	204
1992	274	94	453
1991	262	88	235
1990	147	76	123
1989	163	66	174
1988	181	372	263
1987	118	104	120
1986	95	63	80
1985	67	64	175
1984	145	69	249
1983	177	77	186
1982	95	95	152
1981	143	86	118
1980	135	115	115
1979	238	133	146
1978	100	81	113
1977	140	103	17
1976	194	264	19
1975	194	245	129
1974	202	235	329
1973	189	210	275
1972	283	368	37
1971	81	110	1
1970	12	20	1
Total	5,218	3,447	5,937

There have been many historically significant terrorist incidents within the United Kingdom. In recent history, the UK security services have focused on the threat posed by radical Islamic militant organisations within the UK, such as the cell responsible for the 7 July 2005 London bombings.

- For incidents in Great Britain, see List of terrorist incidents in Great Britain and List of terrorist incidents in London.
- For incidents in Northern Ireland, see Timeline of the Northern Ireland Troubles.

The British state has been accused of involvement in state terrorism in Northern Ireland. A "restricted" 12 June 2008 MI5 analysis of "several hundred individuals known to be involved in, or closely associated with, violent extremist activity" concludes that British Islamist terrorists "are a diverse collection of individuals, fitting no single demographic profile, nor do they all follow a typical pathway to violent extremism". Around half were born in the United Kingdom, the majority are British nationals and the remainder, with a few exceptions, are in the country legally. Most UK terrorists are male, but women are sometimes aware of their husbands', brothers', or sons' activities. While the majority are in their early to mid-20s when they become radicalised, a small but not insignificant minority first become involved in violent extremism over the age of 30. Those over 30 are just as likely to have a wife and children as to be loners with no ties. MI5 says this challenges the idea that terrorists are young Muslim men driven by sexual frustration and lured to "martyrdom" by the promise of beautiful virgins waiting for them in paradise. Those involved in Islamist terrorism have educational achievements ranging from total lack of qualifications to degree-level education. However, they are almost all employed in low-grade jobs. Far from being religious zealots, a large number of those involved in terrorism do not practise their faith regularly. Many lack religious literacy and could actually be regarded as religious novices. Very few have been brought up in strongly religious households, and there is a higher-than-average proportion of converts. Some are involved in drug-taking, drinking alcohol, and visiting prostitutes. The report claims a well-established religious identity actually protects against violent radicalisation, while the influence of clerics in radicalising Islamist terrorists has reduced in recent years.

On 29 August 2014, the British government launched a raft of counter-terrorism measures as the terrorist threat level was raised to "severe". Prime Minister David Cameron and Home Secretary Theresa May warned a terrorist attack was "highly likely", following the coming to prominence of the Islamic State of Iraq and the Levant (ISIL).

On 22 May 2017, 23 people were killed after a bombing occurred following a concert by Ariana Grande in the most deadly terrorist attack on British soil since 2005. After a Cabinet Office Briefing Rooms meeting, UK Prime Minister Theresa May announced that the UK's terror threat level was being raised to 'critical', its highest level. By raising the threat level to "critical", Operation Temperer was started, allowing 5,000 soldiers to replace armed police in protecting parts of the country. BBC's Frank Gardner said that the first deployment of troops is expected to be in the hundreds.

There have been calls for the publication of a report into the financing of terrorism, which the government said it left unpublished for security reasons. Tim Farron said, "Theresa May should be ashamed of the way she has dragged her heels on this issue, first as home secretary and now as prime minister. No amount of trade with dodgy regimes such as Saudi Arabia is worth putting the safety of the British public at risk, and if May is serious about our security, she would publish the report in full, immediately." From June 2016 to June 2017, 379 people in the UK had been arrested for terrorism-linked offences, with 123 of them being charged, 105 of them for terrorism offences. This was a 68% increase from the previous year, which was partly due to various Islamist terror attacks on UK soil, such as the Manchester bombing, the London Bridge attack, and the Westminster attack. The report also said that 19 terrorist plots had been foiled by British police since June 2013.

Jihadist material, including bomb making instructions and execution videos, gets more clicks in the UK than in any other European nation and is spread among a wide range of different domains. Internet companies have been accused of not preventing this. New measures are being considered to stop internet providers from showing this type of content, including fines for internet companies that do not remove jihadist material. David Petraeus said the Parsons Green bomb could have been made from online instructions. Petraeus noted the technical and other skills of the terrorist websites and added, "It is clear that our counter-extremism efforts and other initiatives to combat extremism online have, until now, been inadequate. There is no doubting the urgency of this matter. The status quo clearly is unacceptable."

Police chief, Sara Thornton fears cuts to the police budget will weaken counter terrorism. Thornton maintains that resources needed to deal with terrorist incidents are brought from mainstream policing, adding to the strain on general policing. Thornton maintains that neighbourhood policing is important because it gives people confidence in the police. Then, confident people give the police the information needed to prevent terrorist attacks. Thornton said, "Fewer officers and police community support officers will cut off the intelligence that is so crucial to preventing attacks. Withdrawal from communities risks undermining their trust in us at a time when we need people to have the confidence to share information with us." Thornton also said, "Experts tell us that the spate of attacks in the UK and Europe is a shift, not a spike in the threat, which will take 20 or 30 years to eliminate. This new normality necessitates an open-minded dialogue with the government about how we respond, and our resources have got to be part of the conversation." On July 5, 2025, British law enforcement officers arrested more than 20 individuals in London on suspicion of terrorism-related offences, following public expressions of support for Palestine Action, a group that had been proscribed under the Terrorism Act. The UK government had announced the ban in June 2025, citing a series of direct actions carried out by the group, including an incident in which activists broke into a Royal Air Force base and damaged two aircraft in protest against the UK's ties with Israel.

== Organisations ==
Counter Terrorism Policing is the national collaboration of police forces across the United Kingdom responsible for counter terrorism operations and strategy.

As of March 2018 the British government has designated 58 organisations as terrorist and banned them. 44 of these organisations were banned under the Terrorism Act of 2000. Two of these were also banned under the Terrorism Act of 2006 for "glorifying terrorism." Other than the far-right neo-Nazi National Action, the other fourteen organisations operate (for the most part) in Northern Ireland, and were banned under previous legislation.

Organisations the government has designated as terrorists and banned are:

=== Far-right ===
In 2023, 10% of the Counter Terrorism Police network’s live investigations were extreme Right-Wing. Far-right terrorism has been labelled as the fastest growing terror threat due to previously making up only 6% of cases. The number of arrests, referrals, and terror plots relating to far-right ideologies has increased sharply since 2017.

- Atomwaffen Division
- National Action
- The Base
- Active Clubs
- Maniac Murder Cult

=== Far-left ===
- Kurdistan Workers Party
- Revolutionary People's Liberation Party-Front

=== Irish republican ===
- Continuity Army Council (Continuity Irish Republican Army)
- Cumann na mBan
- Fianna Éireann
- Irish National Liberation Army
- Irish People's Liberation Organisation
- Irish Republican Army
- Saor Éire

=== Ulster unionist ===
- Ulster Defence Association
- Ulster Freedom Fighters (subdivision of Ulster Defence Association)
- Ulster Volunteer Force
- Loyalist Volunteer Force
- Orange Volunteers
- Red Hand Commandos
- Red Hand Defenders

=== Islamist ===
According to political scientist Gilles Kepel, the jihadi violence is rooted in Islamic fundamentalism in the form of Salafism, an ideology that clashes with the values of Western democracies and which entered the United Kingdom when the country gave shelter to radical Islamist leaders from around the world in London. According to Kepel, an individual progresses into violence by first becoming a salafist. Further, he states that Salafist ideology has led to attacking targets that symbolize Western culture, such as the concerts at Manchester and in the Bataclan theater, or deliberately timing attacks to interfere with democratic elections. Scholar Olivier Roy disagrees, saying that the majority of Islamic terrorists are radicals first and are drawn to fundamentalist Islam as a result. He has argued that there's no evidence that they go from Salafism to terrorism, noting that Islamic terrorist Abdelhamid Abaaoud was known to violate religious rules about halal food. Roy has also argued that the burkini bans and secularist policies of France provoked religious violence in France, to which Kepel responded that Britain has no such policies and still suffered several jihadist attacks in 2017.

In the 2000s, there was an increase in the number of British Pakistanis traveling to training camps in the Pashtun regions of Pakistan to join Al-Qaeda and other jihadist groups. The British government received early warnings of this radicalization trend among British Muslims in March 2004, when security authorities foiled the "fertilizer bomb plot" orchestrated by a cell of jihadists of Pakistani origin. The most significant event illustrating this trend was the 7 July 2005 London bombings, a series of suicide bombings in the London Underground which resulted in fifty-two deaths and over seven hundred injuries. The perpetrators had been trained in an Al-Qaeda camp on the Pakistani side of the Afghan–Pakistani border.

In July 2017, it was reported that British authorities had stripped some 150 suspected criminals with dual citizenship of their British passports to prevent them from returning to the UK. Those deprived of their UK citizenship included both "jihadis" and "jihadi brides".

In October 2020, Islamist terrorism remained the greatest threat to the UK by volume according to Ken McCallum, the Director General of MI5. A report published in the same year found that of the 43,000 extremists on MI5's watchlist, around nine-tenths of the people on the list are Islamist extremists. In July 2023, Suella Braverman, the Home Secretary of the United Kingdom, reiterated that Islamic terrorism was the primary domestic threat facing the UK. Islamic terrorism represented 67% of attacks since 2018, 75% of MI5's caseload, and 64% of those in custody for terrorism-connected offences according to the 2023 CONTEST report.

The Independent Reviewer for the government's anti-terror programme (Prevent), Sir William Shawcross, has stated that there was a reluctance to investigate Islamist threats due to fears of being labelled Islamophobic or racist. Instead, staff from the government's anti-terror programme were biased towards tackling far-right threats despite Islamist threats posing a greater risk. His investigation found that 80% of the Counter Terrorism Police network’s live investigations were Islamist. However, Shawcross found that the majority (51%) of Prevent referrals were for mixed, unstable, or unclear (MUU) ideology concerns, followed by extreme right-wing ideology at 25%, and Islamist-related radicalisation made up only 22% of referrals. Trevor Phillips, former Chairman of the Equality and Human Rights Commission, argues that the collapse in Islamist referrals from 2019 onwards coincided with a publication of a report from a group of MPs led by Wes Streeting calling for the definition of Islamophobia to be expanded to include "expressions of Muslimness". Previously, Prevent received around 3,500 Islamist referrals a year, making up about 45% of all referrals. However, the number of Islamist referrals collapsed to 1,500 once dozens of local authorities and other bodies, including the Labour Party, adopted the looser definition of Islamophobia. Meanwhile, the number of right-wing referrals remained the same; however, "no ideology" referrals increased rapidly to 2,500, with Philips arguing some of these cases would have previously been categorised as Islamist referrals and been investigated.

In October 2024, Ken McCallum indicated that the terrorist threat trend he was most concerned about was the worsening threat from Al-Qaeda, and in particular from the Islamic State. Roughly 75% of counter terrorist work remained from Islamist threats, although he highlighted that threats were becoming more sophisticated with people consuming both extreme right-wing and Islamist extremist instructional material. Lone individuals radicalised online made up the majority of threats.

In February 2026, two men were sentenced to life imprisonment in the UK for planning an Islamic State-inspired terrorist attack targeting the Jewish community in Manchester. Prosecutors described the plot as potentially "one of the deadliest terrorist attacks ever carried out on British soil." Walid Saadaoui (38) received a minimum of 37 years, and Amar Hussein (52) a minimum of 26 years, for preparing acts of terrorism between December 2023 and May 2024, including attempts to smuggle assault rifles and ammunition into the UK for use in mass shootings in populated Jewish areas. A third defendant, Bilel Saadaoui, was sentenced to six years for failing to report information about the plot. The attack was foiled when an undercover operative, posing as an arms dealer, helped authorities intercept the conspiracy.

- Abdullah Azzam Brigades, including the Ziyad al Jarrah Battalions (AAB)
- Abu Nidal Organisation
- Abu Sayyaf
- Aden-Abyan Islamic Army
- Al-Gama'a al-Islamiyya
- Al Ghurabaa
- Al-Itihaad al-Islamiya
- Al-Muhajiroun
- Al Murabitun
- Al Qaeda
- Al-Shabaab
- Ansar al-Islam
- Ansar Al Sharia Tunisia
- Ansaru
- Ansar Bait al-Maqdis
- Ansarul Muslimina Fi Biladis Sudan (Vanguard for the protection of Muslims in Black Africa)
- Armed Islamic Group also known as GIA
- Asbat al-Ansar
- Egyptian Islamic Jihad
- Hamas
- Harakat al-Shabaab al-Mujahideen
- Harkat-ul-Jihad al-Islami
- Harkat-ul-Mujahideen
- Harkat-ul-Ansar
- Hezbollah
- Imarat Kavkaz (IK) (also known as the Caucasus Emirate)
- Indian Mujahideen
- Islam4UK
- Islamic Jihad Union
- Islamic Movement of Uzbekistan
- Islamic State of Iraq and the Levant
- Jaish-e-Mohammed
- Jamaat Ansar al-Sunna (formerly Jaish Ansar al-Sunna)
- Jamaat Ul-Furquan
- Jamaat-ul-Mujahideen
- Jemaah Islamiyah
- Jundallah
- Kateeba al Kawthar
- Khuddam ul-Islam
- Lashkar-e-Jhangvi
- Lashkar-e-Toiba
- Minbar Ansar Deen
- Moroccan Islamic Combatant Group
- Muslims Against Crusades
- Palestinian Islamic Jihad
- Popular Front for the Liberation of Palestine – General Command
- Salafist Group for Preaching and Combat
- The Saved Sect
- Sipah-e-Sahaba Pakistan (also known as Ahle Sunnat Wal Jamaat)
- Tehrik Nefaz-e Shari'at Muhammadi
- Tehrik-e Taliban Pakistan

=== Others ===
- Babbar Khalsa
- Balochistan Liberation Army
- Liberation Tigers of Tamil Eelam
- Palestine Action

== See also ==
- Crime in the United Kingdom
- Islamic terrorism in the United Kingdom
- Prevention of Terrorism Act (Northern Ireland)
- Right-wing terrorism in the United Kingdom
- Islamic terrorism in Europe
- List of terrorist incidents
- Hindu terrorism
  - Violence against Christians in India
  - Violence against Muslims in independent India
- Left-wing terrorism
- Right-wing terrorism
- Terrorism in the United States
- Terrorism Acts
- The Troubles
- State-sponsored terrorism § United Kingdom
