= Sharia4Holland =

Former Islamic movement in the Netherlands

Sharia4Holland was an Islamist movement that sought to institute Sharia law in the Netherlands. The group was an offshoot of the Belgian extremist network Sharia4Belgium.

== History ==
At the height of the Occupy movement in 2011, members of Sharia4Holland were first observed handing out radical Islamic flyers at protests in Amsterdam, The Hague and Utrecht, resulting in their monitoring by the General Intelligence and Security Service (AIVD).

During a debate in De Balie in Amsterdam with Tofik Dibi of GroenLinks on 7 December 2011, a group of twenty Muslim radicals stormed the premises, throwing eggs and clamoring for the execution of Canadian writer Irshad Manji, who was present talking about her book Allah, Liberty and Love. The disturbance was brought to an end by the riot police. Two men from Belgium, 19 and 22 year old members of Sharia4Holland, were arrested for their insulting and threatening behaviour.

On 25 May 2012, the movement held a press conference on the Dam Square with Anjem Choudary of Islam4UK, self-titled the Global Shariah Conference. During the conference, a spokesman for Sharia4Holland proclaimed that noted Islam critic Geert Wilders will be 'dealt with' when the Netherlands becomes an Islamic state and that the Dutch should 'learn from the case of Theo van Gogh'. He was arrested for this death threat, summoned and released forty-eight hours later.

== Criticism ==
Several Dutch politicians have criticized Sharia4Holland, including a number from Islamic backgrounds. Ahmed Marcouch of the Labour Party (PvdA) called the ideas of organization violent, Coşkun Çörüz with the Christian Democratic Appeal (CDA) wanted measures to be taken and Jeanine Hennis-Plasschaert of the People's Party for Freedom and Democracy (VVD) referred to their intimidating behavior as 'impossible'. Geert Wilders and his Party for Freedom (PVV) wanted an outright ban on the movement.

== See also ==
- Islam in the Netherlands
- Islam4UK – 2008–2010 UK-based radical Islamist group
