= Sharia4Belgium =

Islamist terrorist organisation

Sharia4Belgium was a Belgian Islamist organisation which advocated for the transformation of Belgium into an Islamic state. In February 2015, a Belgian judge designated the group as a terrorist organisation. The organization was disbanded by 7 October 2012.

In 2010 Sharia4Belgium disrupted a lecture by Benno Barnard at the University of Antwerp. In early April 2010, Belgium's Interior Minister, Annemie Turtelboom, ordered the monitoring of the organisation's website.

In 2011 the organisation described the death of Vlaams Belang politician Marie-Rose Morel as a "punishment of Allah". Then defence minister Pieter De Crem was threatened online due to Belgium’s participation in Operation Odyssey Dawn in Libya. That same year, Sharia4Belgium was summoned to the correctional tribunal for incitement to hatred.

In 2016, the organization was again classified as a terrorist organization after its leader, Fouad Belkacem, was found to have recruited several young men to fight for the Islamic State in Syria. Belkacem and 45 other members were found guilty of membership in a terrorist group.

== Fouad Belkacem ==
Fouad Belkacem, with dual Belgian and Moroccan citizenship, was the spokesman of the organisation and was inspired by UK-based Islamist Anjem Choudary. Also known by the alias "Abu Imran", he repeatedly made controversial comments, and stated he had been praying for Osama bin Laden.

When Belkacem was invited to the 2012 Global Shariah Conference, organised by the radical Islamic movement Sharia4Holland, the Party for Freedom asked ministers Ivo Opstelten and Gerd Leers to treat Belkacem as persona non grata.

Belkacem has a criminal record for burglary and resisting arrest and was sentenced in 2002, 2004 and 2007. In 2012, he was re-sentenced in Antwerp to two years' imprisonment for incitement to hatred towards non-Muslims. Morocco was seeking his extradition in connection with the drug trade.

Belkacem was arrested in Antwerp on the morning of 7 June 2012. He was sentenced in Morocco for possession of illegal drugs.

On 11 February 2015, Belkacem was sentenced to 12 years' imprisonment in Belgium. In October 2018, he was stripped of his Belgian citizenship. In 2026, towards the end of his prison sentence, he applied for asylum in Belgium rather than face proceedings for extradition to Morocco, but was refused.

== See also ==
- Islam in Belgium
- ISLAM (Belgian political party)
- Sharia4Holland – Former Islamic movement in the Netherlands
- Islam4UK – 2008–2010 UK-based radical Islamist group
