= Abu Haleema =

British Muslim radical preacher

Shakil Chapra, better known by his kunya Abu Haleema, is a U.K.-based Islamist commentator. In 2014, he had his passport seized by the British authorities to prevent him leaving the country. In 2015, he was arrested and released on bail. According to the London Evening Standard, he is an associate of Anjem Choudary.

== Background ==
Abu Haleema was born in London to Pakistani immigrants and grew up in South Kilburn. He works part-time as a bus driver. His name, Abu Haleema (أبو حليمة), means Father of Haleema. Haleema is the name of his daughter.

== Passport seized ==
In April 2014, Abu Haleema's home in London was raided by the police, who seized his passport and left a letter from the Home Office explaining that they believed that Haleema intended to travel to Syria to engage in terrorism-related activities. Haleema denied the claim, saying: "They believe I'm involved in terrorism-related activity, which is not true, and that I may have been thinking of going to Syria to fight, which is completely not true".

In January 2015, Abu Haleema was one of around 400 people who had their Twitter accounts closed, reportedly on the orders of the British security services and the Central Intelligence Agency (CIA).

== Arrest ==
In April 2015, Abu Haleema was arrested in London by officers from the Metropolitan Police's Counter Terrorism Command on suspicion of "encouragement of terrorism contrary to Section 1 of the Terrorism Act 2006". Haleema was later released on bail on condition that he did not use social media to promote his views. Abu Haleema was arrested in November 2020 for disseminating Terrorism section 2 Tact. On 2nd July 2021 he was convicted of that offense in Kingston Crown Court by Judge Lodder and sentenced to two and a half years in Prison and one year extended License.

== Activism ==
Abu Haleema is active in social media such as YouTube and Facebook which he uses to spread his views. In January 2016, The Sydney Morning Herald reported that Abu Haleema was attempting to build a support base in Sydney and Melbourne by criticizing moderate Muslim figures in Australia.
