= Anjem Choudary =

British Islamist (born 1967)

- انجم چودهرى
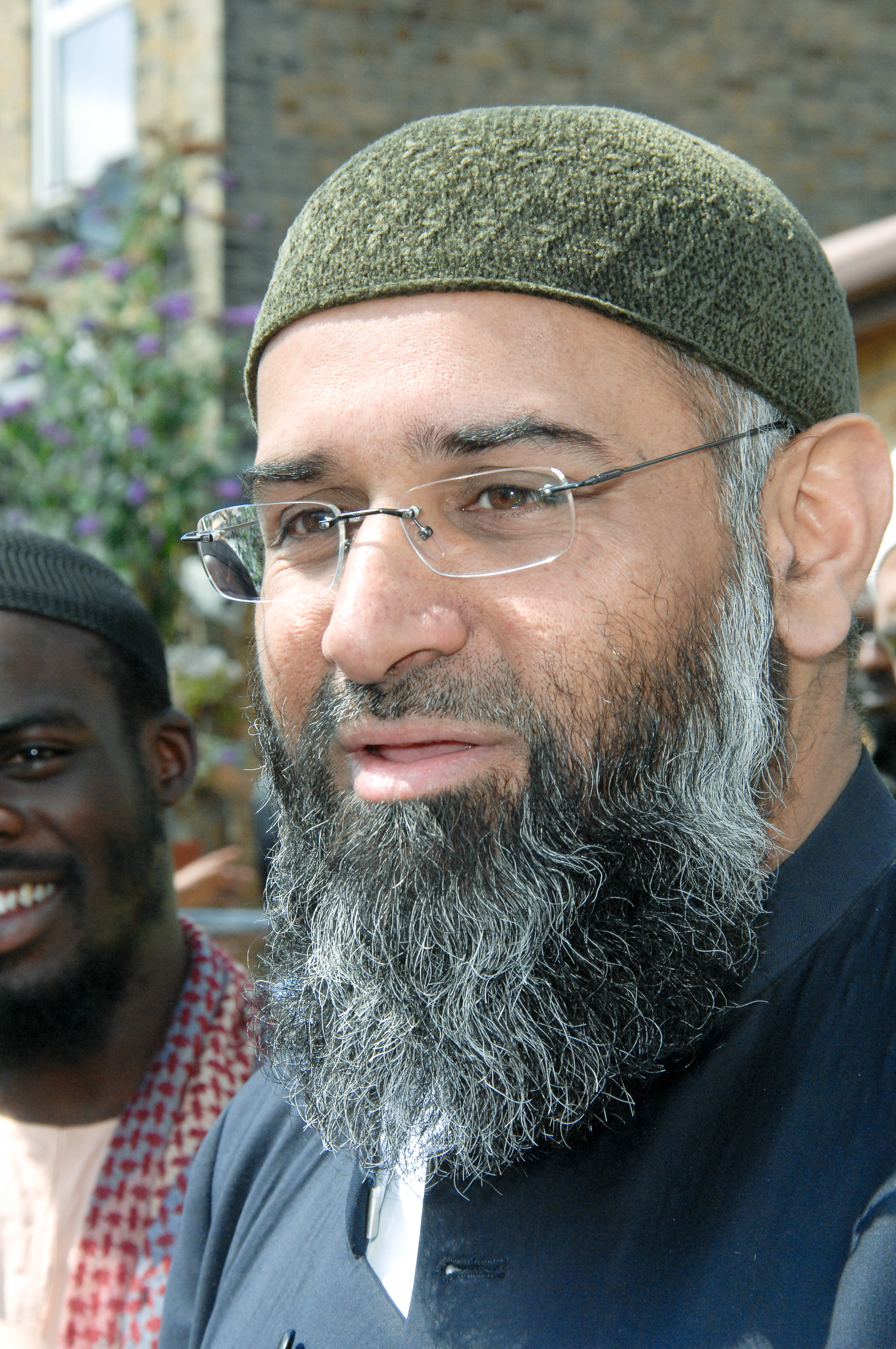
- Choudary in 2011

Spokesman for Islam4UK
- In office November 2008 – 14 January 2010

Personal details
- Born: Anjem Choudary; 18 January 1967 (age 59) London, England
- Spouse: Rubana Akhtar (Akhgar) (m. 1996)
- Children: 4
- Education: Barts, QMUL, UoL; Soton (withdrew; graduated 1991)
- Profession: Formerly a solicitor, no longer on the roll and not entitled to practise
- Religion: Islam (Salafi)
- Criminal charges: Support of a proscribed organisation (2016); Directing a terror organisation (2024)
- Criminal penalty: 5 years and 6 months in prison (2016); Life imprisonment with a minimum term of 28 years (2024)

Anjem Choudary (Note: Urdu: انجم چودهرى) (born 18 January 1967), also known as Abu Luqman, (Note: Urdu: ابو لقمان) is a British Islamist who has been described as "the face" of militant Islamism or the "best known" Islamic extremist in Britain. (Note: "a familiar face to Britons"; "the face of British militant Islamism", "the most famous Islamic State supporter in Britain" and having a "genius for publicity"; "A Google search for 'British Muslim spokesperson' will bring as the top result Anjem Choudary, one of the UK's most dangerous radical preachers, ..."; the "U.K.'s best-known Islamic extremist"; "Counter terrorism police have previously described Choudary as one of the most influential Islamist extremists in Europe. At his Old Bailey trial, prosecutors said he was responsible for radicalising countless individuals.") He was sentenced to life imprisonment in 2024 after being found guilty of directing a terror organisation.

Members of his group have been accused of being linked to between 25 and 40% of terrorist events in Britain up to 2015 according to various researchers, journalists and others, (Note: (see Anjem Choudary#Influence): According to journalist Graeme Wood, quoting Raffaello Pantucci, "members of Choudary's group have been linked to 23 out of 51" terrorist events in Britain as of circa 2015. 23 of 51 equals 45%; The New York Times, estimates Choudary's group, was linked to "25% of all Islamist terrorism-related convictions in Britain between 1998 and 2015".) and of inspiring more than 100 foreign fighters to fight in jihad according to the UK government. After staying "just within the law" for many years, (Note: quote from Commander Dean Haydon, the head of Scotland Yard's counter-terrorism command,) in summer of 2014 Choudary pledged allegiance to the Islamic State's "caliphate", and its "caliph" Abu Bakr al-Baghdadi by Skype. Two years later he was convicted under the Terrorism Act 2000 of inviting support for a proscribed organisation, namely the Islamic State of Iraq and the Levant. He was subsequently subject to sanctions by both the U.S. State Department and the U.N. Security Council freezing his assets. He has been heavily criticised in the UK media.

In 1996, Choudary, with Omar Bakri Muhammad, helped form the Islamist al-Muhajiroun organisation in Britain. The group organised several anti-Western demonstrations, including a banned protest march in London for which Choudary was summoned to appear in court. The UK government banned Al-Muhajiroun in 2010 and Choudary subsequently founded or helped found a series of organizations considered by many to be Al-Muhajiroun under new names—such as Al Guraba', Islam4UK, Sharia4UK, Sharia4Belgium. Among the controversial causes espoused and statements made by Choudary and the group include implementation of Sharia throughout the UK, "Europe, and the wider world"; the conversion of famous British landmarks (Buckingham Palace, Nelson's Column) into palaces for a caliph, minarets, and mosques; praise for those responsible for the 11 September 2001 and 7 July 2005 attacks; calling for the execution of the Pope for criticizing the Islamic prophet Muhammad; and declaring that Muslims reject the concepts of freedom of expression, democracy, and human rights.

Choudary was convicted of inviting support for a proscribed organisation on 6 September 2016, and was sentenced to five years and six months in prison. He was released automatically on licence in October 2018 with restrictions on speaking in public or to the media. On 18 July 2021, his ban on speaking in public was lifted after his licence ended, and as of October 2021 he had reportedly resumed his online campaigns. Following a further prosecution, he was found guilty in July 2024 of directing a terror organisation (Al-Muhajiroun), after an investigation involving police and intelligence forces in the UK, USA and Canada. On 30 July 2024, he was sentenced to life imprisonment with a minimum term of 28 years.

== Early life ==
Anjem Choudary was born in Bexley in South East London on 18 January 1967. The son of market trader, his parents were Punjabi Muslims who migrated to what became Pakistan from East Punjab during the Partition of India in 1947. He attended Mulgrave Primary School, in Woolwich.

In 1996, Choudary married Rubana Akhtar (or Akhgar), who had recently joined al-Muhajiroun, which he led at the time. She later became the group's head of women. The couple have four children.

He enrolled as a medical student at Barts Medical School. While attending university, he was reputed to have indulged in drink and drugs. Responding to claims that he was a "party animal" who joined his friends in "getting stoned", in 2014 Choudary commented "I admit that I wasn't always practising... I committed many mistakes in my life."

He switched to law at the University of Southampton and spent his final year as a legal student (1990–1991) at Guildford, before moving to London to teach ESL. He found work at a legal firm and completed his legal qualifications to become a lawyer. In the early 1990s, he worked in his spare time as an organizer for preacher/scholar Omar Bakri Muhammad, who also supported the reestablishment of the Sunni caliphate.

Choudary became the chairman of the Society of Muslim Lawyers, but was removed from the roll of solicitors (the official register of legal practitioners) in 2002.

== Jihadist military training in Britain ==
On 7 November 1999, The Sunday Telegraph reported that Muslims were receiving weapons training at secret locations in Britain. Most of those who trained at these centres would then fight for Osama bin Laden's International Islamic Front in Chechnya, while others would fight in such places as Kosovo, Sudan, Somalia, Afghanistan, Pakistan and Kashmir. The report identified Anjem Choudary as a key figure in recruiting for these training centres.

== Organisations ==
Choudary's first organization, Al-Muhajiroun, was established in Britain in 1996 and banned in 2010. Choudary was present at the launch of its intended successor, Ahlus Sunnah wal Jamaah, and after that he helped form Al Ghurabaa, which was banned in July 2006. Choudary then became the spokesman for Islam4UK until it was proscribed in 2010. While some sources refer to the Al Guraba', Islam4UK, etc., as successors of Al-Muhajiroun, others describe them as "other names the organisation [Al-Muhajiroun] goes by" to circumvent the ban on the original group.

=== Al-Muhajiroun ===
Choudary embraced Islamism and, with the Islamist militant leader Omar Bakri Muhammed, co-founded al-Muhajiroun, a Salafi organisation. The two men had met at a local mosque, where Bakri was giving a tafsir. In 2002, following a bazaar organised by al-Muhajiroun, Choudary gave a talk on education in Slough. His lecture outlined his ideas for a parallel system of Islamic education in the UK and included elements of the group's ideology. In the same year, although they were refused a permit by the then Mayor of London Ken Livingstone, on 25 August the group held a rally in London. Choudary was summonsed to Bow Street Magistrates' Court in January 2003, on charges which included "exhibiting a notice, advertisement or any other written or pictorial matter", "using apparatus for the amplification of sound", "making a public speech or address" and "organising an assembly".

In 2003 or 2004, he organised an Islamic-themed camping trip, at which Bakri lectured, on the 54-acre (220,000 m^{2}) grounds of the Jameah Islamiyah School in East Sussex. Advertised by word-of-mouth, the trip was attended by 50 Muslim men, most of whom were members of al-Muhajiroun. Bakri later claimed the camp's activities included lectures on Islam, football and paintballing. In September 2006, following allegations that it was used in the training and recruitment of terrorists, police searched the school. According to testimony from Al Qaeda suspects held at the Guantanamo Bay detention camp, in 1997 and 1998, Abu Hamza and groups of around 30 of his followers held training camps at the school, which included training with AK47 rifles and handguns, and a mock rocket launcher. No arrests were made, and students and faculty were allowed to return on 23 September 2006, the first day of Ramadan.

The UK government had investigated expelling Bakri even before the terrorist attacks of 11 September 2001, and in July 2003 the headquarters of al-Muhajiroun, and the homes of Bakri and Choudary, were raided by the police. The following year, under new anti-terrorist legislation, the government announced that it wanted to ban al-Muhajiroun. In 2005, Bakri learned that he was at risk of prosecution for his support of the 7 July 2005 London bombers, and in August left the UK for Lebanon, where he claimed that he was on holiday. After leaving a television station where he said "I will not return to Britain unless I want to go there as a visitor or as a tourist", he was detained by Lebanon's general security department and held in a Beirut prison. Several days later, Bakri was excluded from returning to Britain by the Home Secretary, Charles Clarke, on the grounds that his presence in Britain was "not conducive to the public good." Choudary condemned the decision and demanded to know what Bakri had done to justify the ban. He claimed that ministers were inventing rules to ensure that Bakri could not return. In November, Choudary and three other followers of Bakri were deported from Lebanon and returned to the UK. Choudary blamed the Foreign and Commonwealth Office for orchestrating their deportations, claiming that the four were there to help Bakri set up a madrasah.

Following his deportation, Choudary attended the launch in London of Ahlus Sunnah wal Jamaah, the intended successor organisation to al-Muhajiroun. Choudary said that Bakri was not on the committee of the new group, but that "we would love for the sheikh to have a role." The organisation operates mainly through an invitation-only internet forum, to which Choudary contributes under the screen name Abu Luqman. A reporter visiting the site found calls for holy war, and recordings by Osama bin Laden, Ayman al-Zawahiri, and Omar Bakri Mohammed.

Al-Muhajiroun attempted a relaunch in June 2009 at Conway Hall, in Holborn. Several speakers were invited to share a platform with Choudary, but some later claimed that they had been invited under false pretences. When the group refused to allow women into the meeting, the chairman of the society that runs the hall cancelled the event. He was heckled by many of those in the audience. Choudary took the microphone from the chairman and led chants of "Sharia for UK", saying in reference to the exclusion of women: "Jews and Christians will never make peace with you until you either become like them or adopt their ways." Outside the hall, Choudary criticised British society, predicting that Muslims would make up the majority within one or two decades. When asked why, if society were so bad, he lived here, he replied: "We come here to civilise people, get them to come out of the darkness and injustice into the beauty of Islam."

=== Al Ghurabaa ===
Choudary was also a spokesman for Al Ghurabaa, believed to have been an offshoot of al-Muhajiroun. It was proscribed in 2006 by the then Home Secretary John Reid. Choudary was outraged: "The easy option when one is losing an argument is to ban the opposition voice. ... We [al-Ghurabaa] are not a military organisation; we have only been vociferous in our views—views concerning everything from the government's foreign policy in Iraq and Afghanistan to the host of draconian laws, which they've introduced against us in this country."

=== Islam4UK ===
In November 2008, Choudary organised a meeting of the then recently formed Islam4UK, which, according to its website, was "established by sincere Muslims as a platform to propagate the supreme Islamic ideology within the United Kingdom as a divine alternative to man-made law", and to "convince the British public about the superiority of Islam ... thereby changing public opinion in favour of Islam in order to transfer the authority and power ... to the Muslims in order to implement the Sharee'ah (here in Britain)".

According to Ed Husain, co-founder of the counter-terrorism think-tank the Quilliam Foundation, Islam4UK was a "splinter group of al-Muhajiroun and Hizb ut-Tahrir, the originators of extremism in Britain." Islam4UK was "previously known as al-Muhajiroun, al-Ghurabaa and Muslims Against Crusades", according to the Dutch intelligence agency AIVD. The meeting, advertised as a conference to "rise to defend the honour of the Muslims", was held at the Brady Arts and Community Centre in Tower Hamlets. Choudary then announced that Bakri would be speaking, via a video-conference link, although technical problems meant that his address was instead given over a telephone line. When asked by a Muslim woman how the comments of one of the event's speakers could be justified, with regard to Islam being a religion of peace, Choudary stated, "Islam is not a religion of peace ... It is a religion of submission. We need to submit to the will of Allah."

The rich resources of Afghanistan, its position on the cusp between the Indian sub-continent, Southern Russian, Asia and China and its populations [sic] call for the Shari'ah are the real reasons why the military has sought to establish a permanent role there, no matter what the cost to the lives and wealth of the indigenous people or indeed their own. Pivotal in this is the desire to prevent Muslims from running their own affairs and establishing an Islamic State if they so wish but rather to maintain a puppet in the area (Mr. Karzia) to maintain and protect Western interests.

— Anjem Choudary (3 January 2010), open letter published on Islam4UK website and reprinted in The Telegraph

With the announcement by Islam4UK that it planned to hold a protest march through Wootton Bassett (known for the military funeral repatriations of dead British soldiers returning from the war in Afghanistan), Choudary said "You may see one or two coffins being returned to the UK every other day, but when you think about the people of Afghanistan its a huge number [being killed] in comparison ... I intend to write a letter to the parents of British soldiers telling them the reality of what they died for." Choudary's open letter was published on 3 January 2010. It explained his reasons for proposing the march, endorsed his religious beliefs, and claimed that UK politicians had been lying about the war. Choudary wrote that the proposed march was to "engage the British public's minds on the real reasons why their soldiers are returning home in body bags and the real cost of the war." In an interview with Sky News, he stated that the location was chosen to effect a level of media attention which "it would not have gained anywhere else". The proposal was condemned by the British Prime Minister, Gordon Brown, who said that to offend the families of dead or wounded troops would be "completely inappropriate". The Minhaj-ul-Quran International UK centre in Forest Gate also condemned the proposal, as did the Muslim Council of Britain, which stated that it "condemns the call by the fringe extremist group Islam4UK for their proposed march in Wootton Bassett." The planned march was cancelled by the group on 10 January 2010.

From 14 January 2010, Islam4UK was proscribed under the Terrorism Act 2000, making membership illegal and punishable by imprisonment. Choudary condemned the order. In an interview on BBC Radio he said "we are now being targeted as an extremist or terrorist organisation and even banned for merely expressing that" and "I feel this is a failure of the concept of democracy and freedom." Following his arrest and subsequent release in September 2014 on suspicion of encouraging terrorism, Choudary claimed he was questioned about his membership of or support for proscribed groups including Islam4UK and Need4Khalifah, both of which the government believes are successors to al-Muhajiroun.

== Activism ==
Choudary has regularly attended public marches and, following a protest march outside the Danish Embassy in London on 3 February 2006, held in response to the Jyllands-Posten Muhammad cartoons controversy. As a member of a panel of interviewees on the BBC news programme Newsnight he claimed that the police had inspected and allowed the controversial placards used in the demonstration. Choudary was criticised by his fellow panellists, who included Ann Cryer (then MP for Keighley), Humera Khan (al-Nisa Muslim Women's Group, who accused him of demonising Islam), Sayeeda Warsi (vice-chair of the Conservative Party), Professor Tariq Ramadan (who claimed that Choudary's actions were designed to evoke a strong response from the media), and Roger Knapman (leader of the UK Independence Party).

On 15 March 2006, he was among five men arrested in connection with the demonstration, which had been organised by al Ghurabaa. He was arrested again on 4 May at Stansted Airport for an alleged breach of bail, and charged with organising the protest without notifying police. He was bailed to appear before Bow Street Magistrates' Court on 11 May. On 4 July 2006 he was convicted and fined £500 with £300 court costs.

The following day, at an Al Ghurabaa press conference at the Al Badr centre in Leyton, Choudary claimed that the blame for the London bombings lay with the British government, and said that the then Prime Minister, Tony Blair, had "blood on his hands". He also urged Muslims to defend themselves against perceived attacks by "whatever means they have at their disposal", and referred to the 2 June 2006 Forest Gate raid in which Mohammed Abdul Kahar was shot in the shoulder. He encouraged Muslims not to cooperate with the police under any circumstances. Local council leader Clyde Loakes criticised Choudary's comments, stating "I am sure the vast majority of Waltham Forest residents do not support these views."

Several days later, on 9 June 2006, Choudary organised a demonstration outside the Forest Gate police station in London, to protest against the arrest of the two Forest Gate men. The men's families said that an extremist protest would "only give another opportunity for our community to be portrayed in a negative light" and sent a statement to more than twenty mosques (read to worshippers during prayers) urging them to disassociate themselves from the event. About 35 men and 15 women attended the demonstration.

Had we been aware that Al Ghurabaa was booking the hall, we would have refused this request as the values and ethos of Al Ghurabaa do not reflect those of Al Badr, a community-based organisation committed to help promote community harmony.

— Al Badr spokesman (July 2006)

In September 2006, Pope Benedict XVI gave a speech on the question of the "reasonableness" of the Christian faith, to the University of Regensburg in Germany. In the Regensburg lecture he spoke about rationality in faith, and cited comments by the fourteenth-century Byzantine emperor Manuel II Palaiologos, who, as the Pope put it, said "show me just what Mohamed brought that was new, and there you will find things only evil and inhuman, such as his command to spread by the sword the faith he preached." The citation attracted severe criticism from Muslims around the world, including the parliament of Pakistan, which condemned the Pope for his comments and sought an apology from him. Following the speech, on 17 September Choudary led a protest outside Westminster Cathedral, where he told reporters "Whoever insults the message of Mohammed is going to be subject to capital punishment." The Metropolitan Police investigated his comments, but concluded that "no substantive offences" were committed during the demonstration. The Shadow Home Secretary, David Davis, who had called for action to be taken against Choudary, said: "It is quite disgraceful. It sends out a message to Muslim extremists that we, as a country, do not have the moral courage to stand up to them." However, unnamed sources claim that UK law enforcement had, on multiple occasions, sufficient evidence to make an arrest. They were prevented from doing so as he was allegedly being monitored by British Security Services.

He attempted to enter France to demonstrate against the French government's decision to ban the burka, but was stopped at the port of Calais. His passport was seized and he was issued documents banning him from France indefinitely.

On 13 December 2013, Choudary led a march in Brick Lane, organised by the east London-based Sharia Project, demanding a ban on alcohol being sold by Muslim establishments. An East London Mosque official, speaking of the patrols, identified The Shariah Project as "strongly linked" to Anjem Choudary's banned group Al-Muhajiroun. Abu Rumaysah of The Shariah Project had predicted "hundreds" would join the demonstration, claiming that groups of Muslims would come from as far away as the Midlands to take part. In the event, only a few dozen protesters took part in the march.

Choudary afterwards explained its purpose: "What we did is we posted a notice to the shop owners saying that under Sharia and under the Koran the sale of alcohol is prohibited and if one were to also drink alcohol, that would be 40 lashes. We were there to teach them that just because they are living among non-Muslims is no excuse because Sharia law will be implemented in Britain, and so they should be aware that just because it is not Sharia today, they can't just do whatever they like." He said the Shariah Project group would be arranging many more such rallies.

== Support for ISIS and conviction ==
For decades, Choudary had "stayed [on] the right side of the law"—other than a minor conviction for failing to notify police of a demonstration. But in June 2014, the terror group ISIS (Islamic State of Iraq and Syria) broke through the border between Syria and Iraq. They declared their leader a caliph, their law Sharia, and themselves The Islamic State. Since Choudary had called for the establishment of an Islamic state for many years in his lectures, "he came under intense sustained pressure from his acolytes", to declare his support for the new state. In a private social media message, one supporter, Abu Rumaysah al-Britani, demanded, "We have to declare our position – enough stalling!" Shortly afterwards, Choudary pledged allegiance to the Islamic State's "caliphate," and its "caliph" (Abu Bakr al-Baghdadi) "'via Skype, text and phone' during dinner at a restaurant in London."

But there were legal implications to swearing allegiance. Journalist Dominic Casciani pointed out that Choudary might circumvent laws on terrorism if "he was supporting a political concept" (an Islamic state) – "not the proscribed terrorist group behind it" (the Islamic State). Choudary believed he had, but British detectives "found the evidence — including a crucial IS oath of allegiance published by one of his Indonesian supporters that could be traced back to private social media conversations".

On 5 August 2015, Choudary was charged with one offence under section 12 of the Terrorism Act 2000 for inviting support of a proscribed organisation, namely Islamic State, between June 2014 and March 2015. The trial was postponed to 27 June 2016, and was expected to last no more than four weeks. Choudary was convicted on 28 July 2016. At the Old Bailey on 6 September 2016, Mr Justice Holroyde sentenced Choudary to five years and six months in prison, telling him that he had "crossed the line between the legitimate expression of your own views and a criminal act".

== Post-release and later conviction for directing a terrorist organisation ==
Choudary was released from prison on 19 October 2018. Shortly after his release, it was reported that Choudary would be placed in a probation hostel in London Borough of Camden for six months where he would be required to abide by a number of conditions, such as ban from preaching at or attending certain mosques, he would only be allowed to associate with people who have been approved by the authorities, he would be allowed one phone and was banned from using an internet-enabled device without permission, use of the internet was to be supervised, he was restricted from travel outside Greater London's M25 and he was to not be able to leave the UK without permission.

In mid-May 2019, Choudary was released from a probation hostel and began "the gradual process of becoming a free man". Other members of his organization were also released around that time, and began to "remobilize" their campaign to replace democracy in the UK with a caliphate ruled by Shariah law. Their area of focus (according to The New York Times), included East London and Bedfordshire (including the town of Luton). Their methods included "lower-profile tactics, ... encrypted apps"; instead of recruiting with "provocative public preaching and demonstrations", they now employ "secret internet forums and smaller group meetings in inconspicuous locations". These meeting are legal if the group holding the meeting uses a name that has not been "identified as that of a terrorist outfit" or otherwise banned.

On 18 July 2021, Choudary's ban on speaking in public was lifted—though he was banned from Twitter almost immediately. The Independent reported in October 2021 that he had resumed his online campaigns.

On 17 July 2023, Choudary was arrested by Metropolitan Police counter terrorism officers, along with Khaled Hussein of Canada. The investigation was multi-national and had involved the Metropolitan Police's counter-terrorism unit, MI5, the New York Police Department and the Royal Canadian Mounted Police. On 23 July, Choudary was charged with membership of a proscribed organisation and directing and encouraging support for a proscribed organisation, all contrary to section 56 of the Terrorism Act 2000. Hussein was charged with membership of a proscribed organisation. The court case began in June 2024 and was held at Woolwich Crown Court. On 23 July 2024, he was found guilty of "directing an organisation concerned with the commission of acts of terrorism" and is the first person in the UK to be convicted of this charge. At Woolwich Crown Court on 30 July 2024, Mr Justice Wall sentenced Choudary to life imprisonment with a minimum term of 28 years. His appeal against conviction and sentence was dismissed in March 2026.

== Views ==
Look, at the end of the day innocent people—when we say 'innocent people' we mean Muslims—as far as non-Muslims are concerned they have not accepted Islam and as far as we are concerned that is a crime against God.

— Anjem Choudary, BBC HARDtalk (8 August 2005) (Note: When asked why he would not condemn 7 July bombings when Bakri already had.)

Choudary referred to the hijackers in the 11 September attacks as "magnificent martyrs". In 2003, he said that al-Muhajiroun would "encourage people to fulfil their Islamic duties and responsibilities", although he also said that the group was a political movement and not responsible for individual actions. In 2004, he said that a terror attack on British soil was "a matter of time". He refused to condemn the 7 July 2005 London bombings, but accused the Muslim Council of Britain (who had) of "selling their souls to the devil". He blamed the 2013 murder of Lee Rigby, an off-duty British soldier, on British foreign policy.

Choudary has voiced support for the Muslim community in Somalia, who, he claims, have been "violated" by Christian-backed Ethiopians, and has also called for other members to fight jihad.

The Wall Street Journal describes Choudary as a supporter of "the fundamentalist strain of Islamic teaching known as Salafism". He believes in the primacy of Islam over all other faiths, and the implementation of Sharia law, in its entirety, in the UK. In 2001, he stated that his allegiance is to Islam, and not a country. He believes that, for a true Muslim, "a British passport is no more than a travel document."

In October 2006, Choudary addressed an audience at Trinity College, Dublin to oppose the motion that "This house believes that Islamist violence can never be justified". In February 2008 the Archbishop of Canterbury, Rowan Williams, commented that "as a matter of fact certain provisions of sharia are already recognised in our society and under our law". Choudary responded by saying that Sharia "has to be adopted wholesale", and that "it will come either by embracing Islam because it is the fastest growing religion in the country, or by an Islamic country conquering Britain or by elements embracing Islam and imposing it."

In 2008, Choudary spoke of the "flag of Sharia" flying over Downing Street by 2020, (Note: In 2014 he revised the estimated date of Britain becoming a Muslim country to 2050.) claimed that some Muslim families in east London were having "10 or 12 children each", and that hundreds were converting to Islam each day. Choudary has spoken against elements of the Christian faith. In December 2008, he posted a sermon on an Islamic website, in which he stated: "Every Muslim has a responsibility to protect his family from the misguidance of Christmas, because its observance will lead to hellfire. Protect your Paradise from being taken away – protect yourself and your family from Christmas".

In an interview with Iran's Press TV (which was subsequently posted online on 11 April 2013), Choudary stated "As Muslims, we reject democracy, we reject secularism, and freedom, and human rights. We reject all of the things that you espouse as being ideals ... There is nothing called a republic in Islam. When we talk about the shari'a, we are talking about only the shari'a. We are talking about rejecting the U.N., the IMF, and the World Bank."

In September 2014, Choudary described Abu Bakr al-Baghdadi, leader of the Islamic State of Iraq and the Levant, as "the caliph of all Muslims and the prince of the believers".

Facing a court sentence for inciting terrorism, Choudhary wanted to move to the Islamic State, and said that he thought it a much better society in terms of welfare benefits and other factors.

=== Rationale for doctrine ===
In interviews with Graeme Wood, Choudary gave explanations for some of his beliefs on the necessity of Sharia, terror and caliphate government.

According to Choduary, Sharia provides the best form of law enforcement, because many of its punishments (hand chopping, head chopping, stoning, etc.) though severe, deter crime; while its exemptions (stolen goods must be non-perishable and of significant value, the thief cannot be very poor, etc.) and provisions for preventing false conviction, mean the punishments are seldom enforced, and so demonstrate mercy.

However, "maybe 85% of the Shariah" is "in abeyance until we have khilafah" (caliphate). Sharia punishments, for example, cannot be done by vigilantes but require legal system, "with courts and an executive", (Note: quoting Wood paraphrasing Choduary) which a caliphates provides. While it is true the Islamic State has been criticised for administering stonings, beheadings and amputations at a much higher rate than in classical Muslim times, this is to be expected because "the Islamic State is new and the people living under it have spent many years under kafir governments", (Note: quote from Choduary) so it really should not be "any surprise that they would require correction" (Note: quoting Wood paraphrasing Choduary)

Another distinction between Islam with and without a caliphate is that defensive jihad can be performed without a caliphate, but offensive jihad (jihad al talab) to forcibly expand the realm of true Islam into countries ruled by non-Muslims (in fact all countries, since "Muslim" countries are actually ruled by apostates), requires a caliphate. And offensive jihad will not be an option for the caliphate but an obligation. "The caliph must wage war to expand the domain of Islam, or remove obstacles to its practice, at least once a year", (Note: quoting Wood paraphrasing Choduary) with its goal being world conquest. Because the caliphate should be working to gain territory from neighboring countries, is forbidden by Islamic law (according to Choduary) to have fixed borders with them, and forbidden to have treaties and ceasefires with the enemy lasting more than a decade, (treaties may be renewed but "may not be applied to all enemies at once").

Shirk — polytheism — the worst sin in Islam, (Note: Q.4:116 God forgiveth not (The sin of) joining other gods with Him; but He forgiveth whom He pleaseth other sins than this: one who joins other gods with God, Hath strayed far, far away (from the right).Translation Yusuf Ali (Orig. 1938)) is found in a great many things that others might find innocent of that vice (according to Choduary) — diplomacy, sending an ambassador to the United Nations, voting in UK elections. This is because these things "recognize an authority other than God's". (Note: quoting Wood paraphrasing Choduary)

The brutality of terrorism is justified because it leads to "less suffering". (Note: quoting Wood paraphrasing Choduary) By striking terror into the enemy with slaughter and enslavement, jihadis will hasten victory and thus prevent a long drawn out war with more suffering.

== Terrorist designation and influence ==
=== Designation ===
On 30 March 2017, Choudary was declared a Specially Designated Global Terrorist by the United States Department of State. The designation blocks his assets and prohibits him from engaging in trade or financial transactions with US persons.

On 15 October 2018, Choduary was added into the Al-Qaida Sanctions Committee list of the United Nations Security Council. The designation means that each UN member state is legally obliged to freeze financial assets belonging to Choudary, prevent him from entering or transiting their countries and stop any weapons reaching him.

=== Influence ===
"It is hard to overstate the role Mr. Choudary has played in motivating Islamic extremists", in the words of Ceylan Yeğinsu. According to journalist Graeme Wood, quoting Raffaello Pantucci, "members of Choudary's group have been linked to 23 out of 51" terrorist events in Britain as of circa 2015. These include the murder of Lee Rigby in Woolwich in 2013 and the 7 July 2005 bombings in London which killed 52. The New York Times estimates Choudary's group, was linked to "25% of all Islamist terrorism-related convictions in Britain between 1998 and 2015". Usman Khan, a convicted terrorist and the main perpetrator in the London Bridge terrorist attack on 29 November 2019, was said to be a member of his group. In 2019, the BBC reported that Abdul Lathief Jameel Mohamed, one of the attackers in the 2019 Sri Lanka Easter bombings, that killed more than 250 people, was radicalized by Choudary after attending his sermons in the U.K. in 2006.

The British government estimates that "Choudary and his followers" have "inspired or influenced" more than 100 foreign fighters to fight in jihad. According to the head of Scotland Yard's counter-terrorism command, Dean Haydon,

"These men have stayed just within the law for many years, but there is no one within the counter-terrorism world that has any doubts of the influence that they have had, the hate they have spread and the people that they have encouraged to join terrorist organisations.

"Over and over again we have seen people on trial for the most serious offences who have attended lectures or speeches given by these men."

AIVD, the Dutch intelligence agency, also assessed Choudary "to be a key influence in the spread of the jihadi movement in the Netherlands". Groups led by Choudary were "the single biggest gateway to terrorism in recent British history", according to "the leftwing group Hope Not Hate". In 2013, Hope not Hate presented a report which identified Choudary as "a serious player on the international Islamist scene", saying that although there was no evidence that he was directly responsible for instigating any terrorist plots, "he helped shape the mindset of many of those behind them" and "through his networks linked them up to terror groups and supporters across the world." Choudary dismissed the claims as "fanciful", saying that if they were true, UK security services would have arrested him.

== Public reception and criticism ==
Islam4UK and its leader Anjem Choudary do not represent or speak for Islam or British Muslims but are a "platform" for the extremist movement al-Muhajiroun. There is no room for such kind of people or their organisations in our community or the peaceful religion of Islam.

— Waqar Azmi OBE of the British Muslim Forum

Choudary has enjoyed wide exposure in the UK through "frequent media appearances", and according to Graeme Wood, "accepting absolutely every media request that he receives".

He has been heavily criticised by most UK newspapers, some of which describe him as an extremist, or radical cleric or preacher. In January 2010, British Muslim Guardian contributor Mehdi Hasan wrote: "Is Choudary an Islamic scholar whose views merit attention or consideration? No. Has he studied under leading Islamic scholars? Nope. Does he have any Islamic qualifications or credentials? None whatsoever. So what gives him the right to pontificate on Islam, British Muslims or 'the hellfire'? Or proclaim himself a 'sharia judge'?" Hasan also claimed that Choudary was "as unrepresentative of British Muslim opinion, as he is of British anti-war opinion."

The Conservative Party leader David Cameron said that Choudary "is one of those people who needs to be looked at seriously in terms of the legality of what he's saying because he strays, I think, extremely close to the line of encouraging hatred, extremism and violence."

Salma Yaqoob, then leader of the Respect Party, said in 2010 of Choudary: "He is a bigot whose goal in life is to provoke division. He engages in these provocations because he is deeply hostile to any coming together of Muslims and non-Muslims. For him, the fact that a majority of the British people – Muslim and non-Muslim – oppose the war in Afghanistan is not something to be celebrated, but is something to be feared."

Rod Liddle, writing in The Spectator, said: "Anjem Choudray ... is one of those thick-as-mince gobby little chancers who could only possibly come from Britain." Conservatives in the United States have also been critical of Choudary. Fox News host Sean Hannity invites Choudary on "regularly" (according to journalist Graeme Wood), where he "plays to type" serving as a "howling weird-beard of radical Islam ... in the villain-hero dichotomy of pro wrestling, a Muslim 'heel' to Sean Hannity's Christian 'face'." (Hannity has called Choudary "one sick, miserable, evil S.O.B." during a segment on his show discussing the 2011 Egyptian protests).

Choudary has been denounced by mainstream Muslim groups. However, in January 2010, Jamie Bartlett, a writer for The Daily Telegraph, speculated that he might have "some" support among the minority of Muslims in the UK who could be considered to hold similar views. The following year, Peter Oborne, defending Baroness Warsi's criticism of how British Muslims have been treated, singled out Choudary as an exception to the majority that were "decent people". According to journalist Graeme Wood, despite his "genius for publicity", Choudary has "considerable ignorance" of Islam and the language of its scriptures – Arabic. When "confronted on fine details of Islamic law, his main tactic is to change the subject". According to Wood, his Muslim critics "destroy" him in public debate, and Wood quotes one British Muslim as saying, 'How the hell he passes himself off as a Shariah court judge, I'll never know.' At least one fellow Islamic State supporter (Musa Cerantonio) has criticized him and his followers on doctrinal grounds—for their acceptance of qiyas, their veneration of Omar Bakri Muhammad (whom they consider a mujaddid), and failure to emigrate to the Islamic State ("we say, 'Some of you have got passports! Why are you still there?'").

Tabloid criticism of Islam4UK and Choudary since news of the proposed march first became public has, generally, been vitriolic, calling him a "hate preacher".

Among the claims made about him is that he collects Jobseeker's Allowance (with four children he collects £25,000, or almost US$39,000 per year), and has explained "to followers how to receive government assistance they can use to fund a Muslim holy war". In a "secretly recorded video" he called the allowance "Jizya" (protection money or tribute paid to Muslims by non-Muslims) "which is ours anyway".

== Publications ==
He has written many pamphlets and articles, including Human Rights: Comparison between the Declaration of Human Rights and Divine Rights in Islam and Groups and Parties in Islam: The Islamic Verdict.

== See also ==
- Abu Haleema
- Muslims Against Crusades
- List of British Pakistanis
