= British Muslim Forum =

Barelvi organisation

- Formation: 13 November 2008; 17 years ago
- Headquarters: Eaton Hall, Retford, United Kingdom
- Secretary: Muhammad Imdad Hussain Pirzada
- Director: Khalil Ahmed Haqqani
- Director: Mahroof Hussain
- Website: www.britishmuslimforum.co.uk

The British Muslim Forum is a non-governmental Islamic organization of Barelvi movement of Sunni Muslims which represents 500 Mosques across the United Kingdom. Muhammad Imdad Hussain Pirzada is the current Secretary of the organization.

== Leaders ==
Following are the founding members and main leaders of BMF.

- Shaykh Muhammad Imdad Hussain Pirzada (Retford, UK)
- Shaykh Syed Maroof Hussain Shah (Bradford, UK)
- Shaykh Mohammad Habib-ur-Rehman Mahboobi (Bradford, UK)
- Allama Shahid Raza Na’eemi (London, UK)
- Allama Ahmad Nisar Beg Qadri (Manchester, UK)
- Allama Muhammad Bostan Qadri (Birmingham, UK)
- Allama Riaz Ahmad Samdani (London, UK)
- Allama Khalil Ahmed Haqqani (London, UK)
- Allama Masood Alam Khan Al-Azhari (Nottingham, UK)

== Fatwa issued 2005 in response to the London bombings ==
On behalf of over 500 clerics, scholars and Imams the British Muslim Forum issues the following religious decree:

Islam strictly, strongly and severely condemns the use of violence and the destruction of innocent lives. There is neither place nor justification in Islam for extremism, fanaticism or terrorism. Suicide bombings, which killed and injured innocent people in London, are haram - vehemently prohibited in Islam - and those who committed these barbaric acts in London are criminals not martyrs. We pray for the defeat of extremism and terrorism in the world. We pray for peace, security and harmony to triumph in multicultural Great Britain.

Gul Mohammad, the then, secretary-general of the BMF, quoted the Koran saying: "Whoever kills a human being ... then it is as though he has killed all mankind, and whoever saves a human life it is as though he had saved all mankind.
