= Islam4UK =

2008–2010 UK-based radical Islamist group

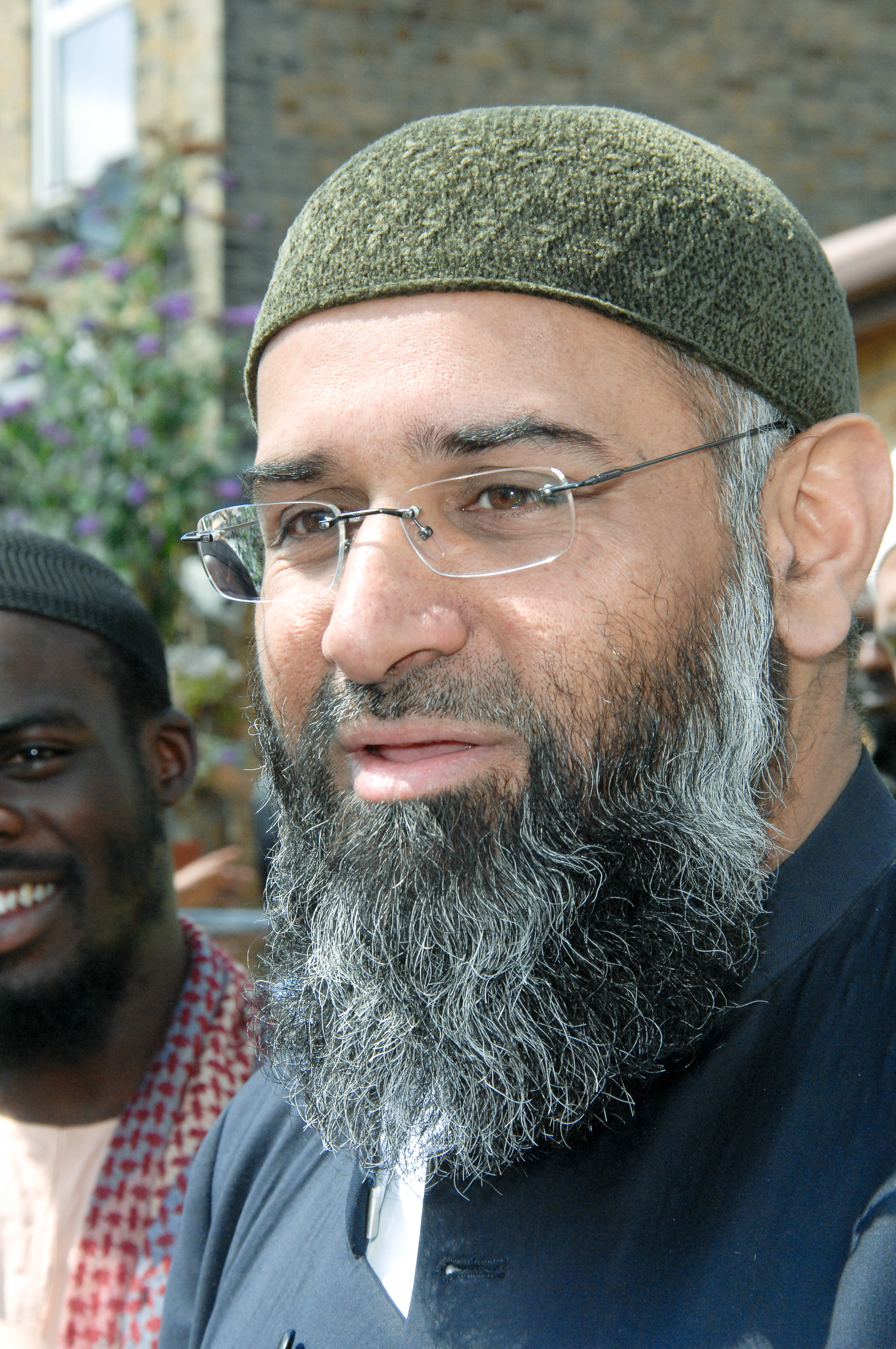
- Islam4UK founder Anjem Choudary in 2011
- Formation: 2008
- Founder: Anjem Choudary
- Founded at: United Kingdom
- Dissolved: 2010
- Purpose: To make the UK an Islamic state
- Headquarters: United Kingdom
- Official language: English

Islam4UK was a radical Islamist group that operated in the United Kingdom. The group was proscribed as a terrorist organisation under the UK's counterterrorism laws on 14 January 2010. Before its proscription it was led by Anjem Choudary.

On its website, Islam4UK described itself as having "been established by sincere Muslims as a platform to propagate the supreme Islamic ideology within the United Kingdom as a divine alternative to man-made law" to "convince the British public about the superiority of Islam, thereby changing public opinion in favour of Islam in order to transfer the authority and power to the Muslims in order to implement the Sharia (in Britain)".

== Activities ==
On 16 October 2009, members of the organisation protested against the visit to Britain by Dutch MP Geert Wilders. They carried banners with slogans such as "Shariah is the solution, freedom go to hell" and "Geert Wilders deserves Islamic punishment".

In January 2010, the group gained widespread media attention by announcing plans to hold a protest march through Wootton Bassett (now Royal Wootton Bassett); an English town where unofficial public mourning takes place for corteges of armed forces personnel killed on active service, as they make their way from RAF Lyneham to Oxford. Reports that the group planned to carry empty coffins to "represent the thousands of Muslims who have died" were denied by the group, although the empty coffins had been proposed by Choudary himself. Choudary said that the event would be peaceful, and that it was not timed to coincide with any mourning processions. The announcement was condemned by British Prime Minister Gordon Brown, who said that plans for the march were "disgusting" and that "to offend the families of dead or wounded troops would be completely inappropriate". The Home Secretary, Alan Johnson, indicated he would agree to any request from the Wiltshire Police or local government to ban the march under Section 13 of the Public Order Act 1986.

Choudary said he chose Wootton Bassett to attract maximum attention and, he asserted, 500 members of Islam4UK would carry 'symbolic coffins' in memory of the Muslim civilians 'murdered by merciless' coalition forces.

The Muslim Council of Britain stated that it "condemns the call by...Islam4UK for their proposed march in Wootton Bassett", and continues, "Like other Britons, Muslims are not opposed to Britain’s Armed Forces." The Wiltshire Islamic Cultural Centre stated "We, along with all other Muslim community groups in Wiltshire and the surrounding area, including Bath Islamic Society and Swindon Thamesdown Islamic Association, unreservedly condemn this march," adding, "Therefore we are putting the record straight and letting the media and general public know that the vast majority of Muslims have nothing to do with this group", and asking that Wiltshire Police ban the march. They stated that they, along with Call to Islam Centre and Masjid Al-Ghurabah, would counter-demonstrate against "Islam4UK/Al-Muhajiroon".

On 10 January 2010, Islam4UK said it was cancelling its planned march in Wootton Bassett; however, the police had not actually received a request for permission for the march.

== Proscription ==
Islam4UK was listed as an alias of Al Ghurabaa and The Saved Sect, already proscribed under the Terrorism Act 2004, by an order on 14 January 2010. In announcing the proscription, the then British Home Secretary Alan Johnson said: "It is already proscribed under two other names – Al Ghurabaa and The Saved Sect".

In the January 2010 order and a November 2011 order, the names Al Muhajiroun, Call to Submission, Islamic Path, London School of Sharia and Muslims Against Crusades were also listed as aliases. In June 2014, Need4Khilafah, the Shariah Project and the Islamic Dawah Association were added to the list. Note that the order is not needed to establish an alias as identical to another name of a proscribed organization, it is enough that the two are to all intents and purposes the same, and that the individual prosecuted has performed a proscribed act.

Islam4UK issued a statement saying, "Today's ban is another nail in the coffin of capitalism and another sign of the revival of Islam and Muslims." They restated their goal: "Therefore, we will one day liberate our land from occupation and implement the Shariah not just in Muslim countries but also right here in Great Britain. This is something that we believe in, live by and hope that in our lifetime we will witness". In a further statement, issued on the same day via their website, they stated that "Islam4UK has been contacted by authorities to (force) shut down its operations, we stress this domain name will no longer be used by us, but the struggle for Khilafah (aka "the Caliphate") will continue regardless of what the disbelievers plot against the Muslims. It is the duty of all Muslims to rise up and call for the Khilafah wherever they may be".

The ban has led some ("the left", according to Sunny Hundal writing in The Guardian) to criticise it as a "blow to free expression", which will "serve to undermine the government’s effort to prevent violent extremism". Deborah Orr has commented in The Guardian that the ban "erodes democratic rights with the intention of defending them".

== See also ==
- Islam in the United Kingdom
- Sharia4Belgium – Islamist terrorist organisation
- Sharia4Holland – Former Islamic movement in the Netherlands
