= Jameah Islameah School =

Islamic school in East Sussex, UK

Coordinates: 51.0546°N 0.2488°E

Information
- School type: Private school
- Religious affiliation: Islam
- Closed: 2007
- Gender: Boys
- Age: 11 to 16

Jameah Islameah School was an independent Islamic school in East Sussex. The school was located on a 54 acre site and had residential facilities to house male students aged 11 to 16. The school was independently owned and the proprietor functioned as the principal. In December, 2008, Jameah Islameah was inspected by the Office for Standards in Education which noted that it "does not provide a satisfactory education for its pupils." At the time of the inspection, the school had nine students. According to BBC News the school purported to teach students to become Islamic leaders, training them to the level high enough to teach in local Masjids and Madrassas.

== Terrorism arrests ==
There had been allegations that the school was used in the training and recruitment of terrorists. According to testimony from Al Qaeda suspects held at Guantanamo Bay, in 1997 and 1998, Abu Hamza and groups of around 30 of his followers held terrorist training camps at the school, including training with AK47 rifles and handguns, as well as a mock rocket launcher. In 2003 or 2004, the grounds of the school were used for an Islamic-themed camping trip, at which Omar Bakri Mohammed lectured. The trip, which was advertised by word-of-mouth, was attended by 50 Muslim men, most of whom were members of al-Muhajiroun. Bakri claimed the activities at the camp included lectures on Islam, football, and paintballing.

On 1 September 2006 the Jameah Islameah school was searched by up to a hundred police officers as part of their operations, although no arrests were made. According to a BBC News report published on 2 September 2006, the operation was intelligence-led and unrelated to the 7 July attacks or the transatlantic jet bomb plot. The report also noted that no arrests were made at the school. BBC Web Archive Version as part of their operations, although no arrests were made. Despite the extensive investigation, Sussex Police later issued a formal letter in 2009 confirming that no illegal activity was found at the Jameah Islameah School, and commended the staff and students for their respectful and cooperative conduct throughout the operation. The local Sussex Police held a cordon around the site for 24 days in an operation that cost them over one million pounds. Meanwhile the Metropolitan Police searched the buildings and grounds and the lake.

On the evening of 2 September over 40 police officers entered a south London halal Chinese restaurant called The Bridge to China Town and, after talking to customers for over an hour, arrested twelve on suspicion of the commission, preparation or instigation of acts of terrorism. Two further arrests were made elsewhere in London.

By 6 September two men had been released.

== Closing ==
On 9 February 2007 the Department for Education and Skills closed down the school, because it "continues to fail to meet the standards which all independent schools must meet under the Education Act 2002." The school had not been operating at the time, due to lack of students. The school's website remained online until July 2014.

== Former use of buildings ==
The main Victorian building began life as St Michael's Orphanage. In the 1920s it later became St Joseph's College, a Roman Catholic Junior Seminary until 1970, before being converted into a ballet school. The Legat School of Ballet, formed by Nicholas Legat and his wife Nadine in London moved to the Marks Cross site in the 1970s and became residential. The ground floor of the main building holding academic lessons, the first floor housed two large dance studio and an art studio while the second floor attic was used for dormitories. The annex to the rear housed staff and senior pupils aged over 16. A third dance studio was housed in a wooden hut beside the rear driveway and several prefabricated buildings to the rear were used for academic lessons and dormitories.

The church building was converted into a theatre, and other facilities such as a swimming pool and tennis courts were also provided. Many famous names from the world of ballet were associated with the school, including Eunice Bartell, Pearl Gaden, Anna Lendrum, Hans Meister and Laverne Meyer. The buildings were severely damaged during the storm of 1987 which saw a number of the pre-fabs destroyed, the main building roof lost a number of slates which then damaged other buildings and the roof of the bell tower collapsed.

By 1990, with falling admissions, the School had begun to struggle financially (despite taking on pupils from the nearby Bush Davies School of Education and Theatre Arts which had gone bankrupt the year before) and was unable to afford the repair bill. Insurance alone was insufficient to foot the bill. Closure came in July 1990 when Legat merged with Wadhurst College and moved to their site at Best Beech Hill, approximately 4 miles to the east, only for that site to close a few years later when a further merger with Bellerbys College occurred.
