= Muslims Against Crusades =

Banned Islamist group in the United Kingdom

Muslims Against Crusades (MAC) is a banned radical Islamist group in the United Kingdom. The group was founded in 2010 by Abu Assadullah. Professional boxer Anthony Small and Islam4UK spokesman Anjem Choudary are associated with the group.

Muslims Against Crusades maintain that Muslims are not "obliged to obey the law of the land in whatever country they reside". In 2011, the group proposed that Muslims should set up independent emirates in select cities in the UK, operating under sharia (Islamic law) entirely outside British law. The group suggested the towns of Bradford, Dewsbury, and Tower Hamlets in the East End of London as the possible first test beds for these entities. The group has often clashed with the English Defence League. Home Secretary Theresa May banned the group from midnight on 11 November 2011, making membership or support of the group a criminal offence.

The group has been denounced by the Muslim Council of Britain, who described MAC as "a tiny, and utterly deplorable, extremist group".

== Rallies ==
MAC is responsible for a number of incidents, including protests outside the Royal Albert Hall and in Kensington on 11 November 2010, when two large plastic poppies were burned during the Remembrance Day silence.

A 2010 Remembrance Day ceremony in London was disrupted by members of the organization, who were protesting against British military presence in Afghanistan and Iraq. They burnt large poppies and chanted "British soldiers burn in hell" during the two-minute silence. Two of the men were arrested and charged for threatening behaviour. One was convicted and fined £50. The same group planned to hold another protest in 2011 named Hell for Heroes, declaring that soldiers fighting in Iraq and Afghanistan deserve to go to hell. The group was banned by the Home Secretary the day before the planned protest. Throughout 2010 and 2011 there were various protests against the imprisonment of Muslims, with calls for their release; and calls for a withdrawal of non-Muslim forces from Muslim countries. There was a protest against pastor Terry Jones when he burnt a Quran (the holy book of Islam) in Florida, US on 20 March 2011.

They applied to the police to stage a demonstration in London to disrupt the royal wedding of Prince William and Catherine Middleton on 29 April 2011, but this was not allowed.

On 2 May 2011, Osama bin Laden, who had led the Islamist al-Qaeda organization responsible for violent attacks on the United States on 11 September 2001, was killed in Pakistan by US forces. On 7 May, hundreds of UK Muslims and MAC members held a rally and Salat al-Janazah (funeral prayer) for him outside the US embassy in London. When protesters tried to storm the embassy, there were clashes with police.

On 30 July, around 50 members of MAC and Waltham Forest Muslims marched for two hours from Leyton tube station to Walthamstow town square, calling for democracy to be replaced by sharia law and chanted slogans such as 'democracy—hypocrisy', 'Sharia for UK' and 'Secularism go to hell'. In August, members of Muslims Against Crusades held a demonstration denouncing the Shia denomination and "anti-Islamic" Shia regimes of Syria and Iran. To mark the tenth anniversary of the 11 September attacks, around 100 men linked to the group protested outside the US Embassy in London, burning US flags and chanting through megaphones. The protest could be heard by mourners in the September 11th Memorial Garden nearby, where a minute's silence was being observed to mark the first airplane hitting the World Trade Center in New York City.

On 10 November 2011, British Home Secretary Theresa May banned the group after it planned to repeat the poppy-burning demonstration; membership of Muslims Against Crusades became illegal at midnight.

On 2 December 2011, twenty people were arrested on suspicion of being members of a banned group, and two for obstruction and violent disorder at a demonstration outside the US Embassy in London; the police did not confirm a report that the protesters were members of MAC.

== Cultural impact ==
On Have I Got News for You, the group was discussed, with Ian Hislop saying "aren't they a couple hundred years late, these Muslims Against Crusades?"

== See also ==
- Crusades
